= Canton of Criquetot-l'Esneval =

Coordinates: 49°39′05″N 0°13′56″E

Criquetot-l'Esneval
- Former canton
- Interactive map of Criquetot-l'Esneval
- Country: France
- Region: Normandy
- Department: Seine-Maritime
- No. of communes: {{{nbcomm}}}
- Disbanded: 2015
- Area: 134.96 km^{2} (52.11 sq mi)
- Population (2012): 16,394
  - Density: 121.47/km^{2} (314.61/sq mi)

The Canton of Criquetot-l'Esneval is a former canton situated in the Seine-Maritime département and in the Haute-Normandie region of northern France. It was disbanded following the French canton reorganisation which came into effect in March 2015. It consisted of 21 communes, which joined the canton of Octeville-sur-Mer in 2015. It had a total of 16,394 inhabitants (2012).

== Geography ==
A farming and coastal area in the arrondissement of Le Havre, centred on the town of Criquetot-l'Esneval. The altitude varies from 0m (Bénouville) to 137m (Gonneville-la-Mallet) for an average altitude of 104m.

The canton comprised 21 communes:

- Angerville-l'Orcher
- Anglesqueville-l'Esneval
- Beaurepaire
- Bénouville
- Bordeaux-Saint-Clair
- Criquetot-l'Esneval
- Cuverville
- Étretat
- Fongueusemare
- Gonneville-la-Mallet
- Hermeville
- Heuqueville
- Pierrefiques
- La Poterie-Cap-d'Antifer
- Sainte-Marie-au-Bosc
- Saint-Jouin-Bruneval
- Saint-Martin-du-Bec
- Le Tilleul
- Turretot
- Vergetot
- Villainville

== Population ==
Historical population Canton of Criquetot-l'Esneval
Year	1962	1968	1975	1982	1990	1999
Pop.	7,966	8,638	9,614	12,116	13,455	14,468
±%	—	+8.4%	+11.3%	+26.0%	+11.1%	+7.5%
From the year 1962 on: No double counting – residents of multiple communes (e.g. students and military personnel) are counted only once. Source: INSEE

== See also ==
- Arrondissements of the Seine-Maritime department
- Cantons of the Seine-Maritime department
- Communes of the Seine-Maritime department
