= Communauté de Communes du Canton de Criquetot-l'Esneval =

Coordinates: 49.64°N 0.27°E

Canton de Criquetot-l'Esneval
- Former communauté de communes
- Country: France
- Region: Normandy
- Department: Seine-Maritime
- No. of communes: {{{nbcomm}}}
- Established: 28 December 2001
- Disbanded: 1 January 2019
- Area: 134.96 km^{2} (52.11 sq mi)
- Population (2015): 16,555
  - Density: 122.67/km^{2} (317.70/sq mi)

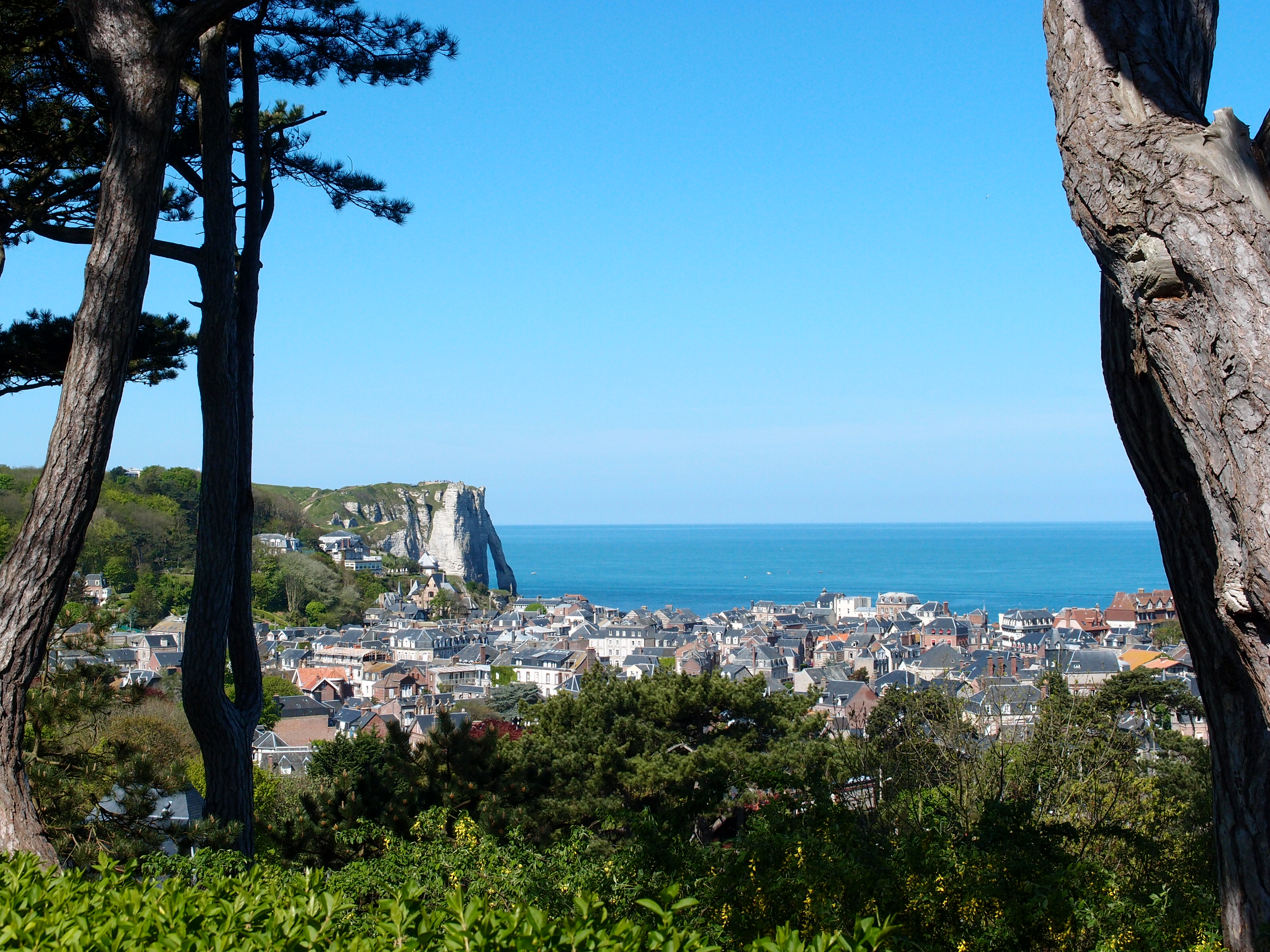
The Étretat commune in 2012

The communauté de communes du Canton de Criquetot-l’Esneval is a former intercommunality in the Seine-Maritime département of the Normandy region of northern France. It was created on 28 December 2001. and it was merged into the new communauté urbaine Le Havre Seine Métropole on 1 January 2019.

== Composition ==
The communauté de communes consisted of the following 21 communes:

- Angerville-l'Orcher
- Anglesqueville-l'Esneval
- Beaurepaire
- Bénouville
- Bordeaux-Saint-Clair
- Criquetot-l'Esneval
- Cuverville
- Étretat
- Fongueusemare
- Gonneville-la-Mallet
- Hermeville
- Heuqueville
- Pierrefiques
- La Poterie-Cap-d'Antifer
- Saint-Jouin-Bruneval
- Saint-Martin-du-Bec
- Sainte-Marie-au-Bosc
- Le Tilleul
- Turretot
- Vergetot
- Villainville

== See also ==
- Communes of the Seine-Maritime department
