= Agglomeration community of Le Havre =

Coordinates: 49.49°N 0.11°E

Havraise
- Former communauté d'agglomération
- Country: France
- Region: Normandy
- Department: Seine-Maritime
- No. of communes: {{{nbcomm}}}
- Established: January 2001
- Disbanded: January 2019
- Area: 190.65 km^{2} (73.61 sq mi)
- Population (2014): 240,323
  - Density: 1,260.5/km^{2} (3,264.8/sq mi)
- Website: www.agglo-lehavre.fr

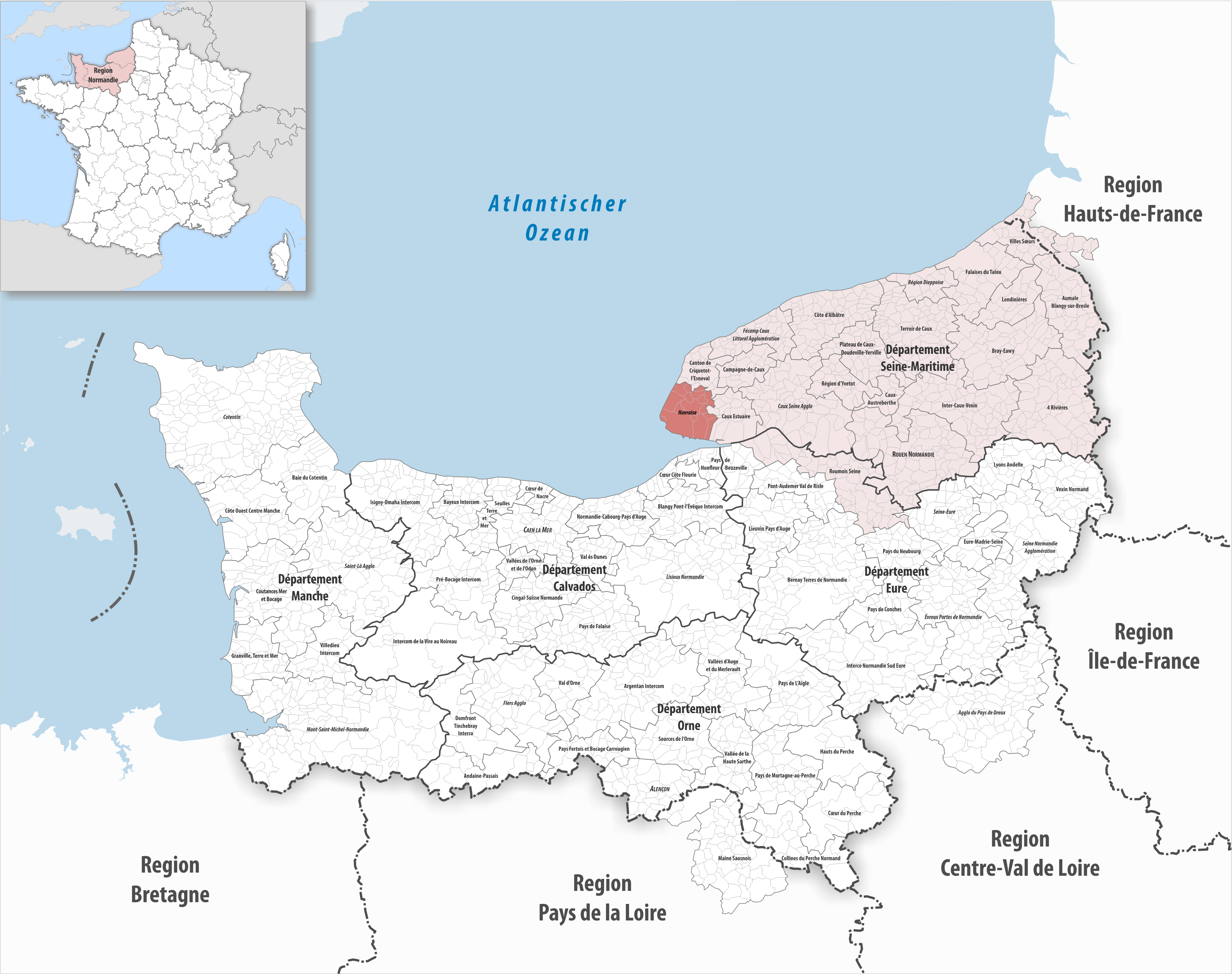
Location of the Havraise community association

The Agglomeration community of Le Havre (French: Communauté de l'agglomération havraise) is a former communauté d'agglomération, an intercommunal structure, centred on the city of Le Havre. It is located in the Seine-Maritime department, in the Normandy region, northern France. It was created in January 2001. It was merged into the new communauté urbaine Le Havre Seine Métropole on 1 January 2019. Its population was 239,806 in 2015, of which 174,911 in Le Havre proper.

== Composition ==
The communauté d'agglomération consisted of the following 17 communes:

Municipality	Population (2007)	Area	Density	Year	Délégués
Cauville-sur-Mer	1,370	11.7 km^{2}	117 inhabitants/km^{2}	2001	1
Épouville	2,823	5.59 km^{2}	505 inhabitants/km^{2}	2001	2
Fontaine-la-Mallet	2,712	6.68 km^{2}	406 inhabitants/km^{2}	2001	2
Fontenay	1,037	5.60 km^{2}	185 inhabitants/km^{2}	2001	1
Gainneville	2,612	4.65 km^{2}	562 inhabitants/km^{2}	2001	2
Gonfreville-l'Orcher	9,145	25.81 km^{2}	354 inhabitants/km^{2}	2001	3
Harfleur	8,124	4.21 km^{2}	1 930 inhabitants/km^{2}	2001	3
Le Havre	179,751	46.95 km^{2}	3 829 inhabitants/km^{2}	2001	18
Manéglise	1,151	8.35 km^{2}	138 inhabitants/km^{2}	2001	1
Mannevillette	831	4.20 km^{2}	198 inhabitants/km^{2}	2001	1
Montivilliers	16,241	19.09 km^{2}	851 inhabitants/km^{2}	2001	4
Notre-Dame-du-Bec	425	3.96 km^{2}	107 inhabitants/km^{2}	2001	1
Octeville-sur-Mer	5,516	20.37 km^{2}	271 inhabitants/km^{2}	2001	2
Rogerville	1,253	0.95 km^{2}	1 319 inhabitants/km^{2}	2001	1
Rolleville	1,137	7.06 km^{2}	161 inhabitants/km^{2}	2001	1
Sainte-Adresse	7,731	2.15 km^{2}	3 595 inhabitants/km^{2}	2001	3
Saint-Martin-du-Manoir	1,489	5.13 km^{2}	290 inhabitants/km^{2}	2001	1
17 communes	243,348	182.45 km^{2}	1 334 inhabitants/km^{2}	–	47
