= Canton of Montivilliers =

Coordinates: 49°33′58″N 0°11′22″E

Montivilliers
- Former canton
- Interactive map of Montivilliers
- Country: France
- Region: Normandy
- Department: Seine-Maritime
- No. of communes: {{{nbcomm}}}
- Disbanded: 2015
- Area: 97.27 km^{2} (37.56 sq mi)
- Population (2012): 35,156
  - Density: 361.4/km^{2} (936.1/sq mi)

The Canton of Montivilliers is a former canton situated in the Seine-Maritime département and the Haute-Normandie region of northern France. It was disbanded following the French canton reorganisation which came into effect in March 2015. It had a total of 35,156 inhabitants (2012).

== Geography ==
An area of farming and light industry in the arrondissement of Le Havre, centred on the town of Montivilliers. The altitude varies from 0m (Cauville-sur-Mer) to 118m (Manéglise) with an average altitude of 55m.

The canton comprised 11 communes:

- Cauville-sur-Mer
- Épouville
- Fontaine-la-Mallet
- Fontenay
- Manéglise
- Mannevillette
- Montivilliers
- Notre-Dame-du-Bec
- Octeville-sur-Mer
- Rolleville
- Saint-Martin-du-Manoir

== Population ==
Historical population Canton of Montivilliers
Year	1962	1968	1975	1982	1990	1999
Pop.	15,706	16,451	19,246	29,736	33,442	34,212
±%	—	+4.7%	+17.0%	+54.5%	+12.5%	+2.3%
From the year 1962 on: No double counting – residents of multiple communes (e.g. students and military personnel) are counted only once. Source: INSEE

== See also ==
- Arrondissements of the Seine-Maritime department
- Cantons of the Seine-Maritime department
- Communes of the Seine-Maritime department
