= Les Trois-Pierres =

- Commune
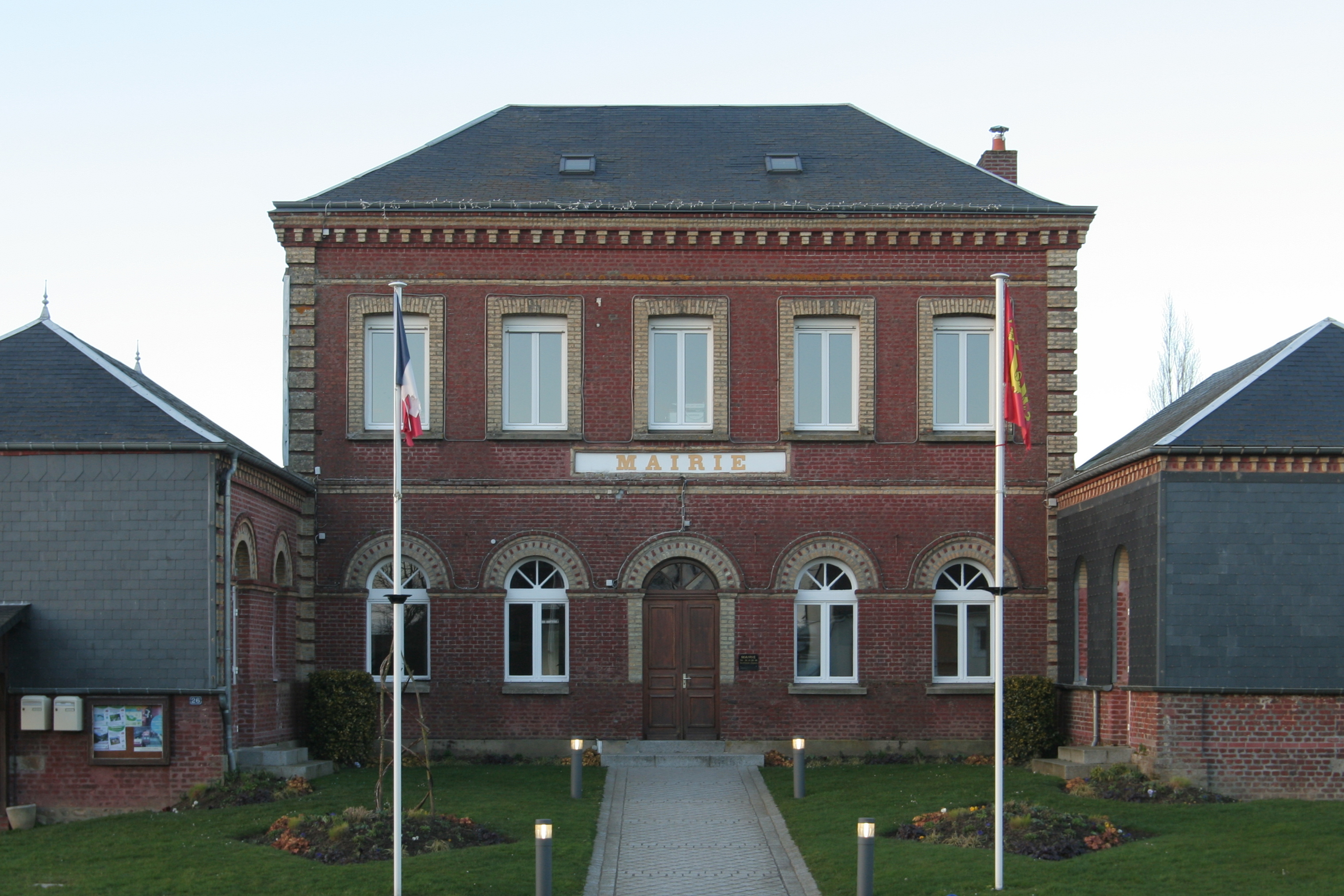
- The town hall in Les Trois-Pierres

- Coat of arms
- Location of Les Trois-Pierres
- Location within France Location within Normandy
- Coordinates: 49°32′52″N 0°25′00″E
- Country: France
- Region: Normandy
- Department: Seine-Maritime
- Arrondissement: Le Havre
- Canton: Saint-Romain-de-Colbosc
- Intercommunality: Le Havre Seine Métropole

Government
  - Mayor (2026–32): Nicolas Jachiet
- Area^{1}: 7.48 km^{2} (2.89 sq mi)
- Elevation: 110 m (360 ft)
- Highest elevation: 132 m (433 ft)
- Lowest elevation: 63 m (207 ft)
- Population (2023): 832
  - Density: 111/km^{2} (288/sq mi)
- Time zone: UTC+01:00 (CET)
  - Summer (DST): UTC+02:00 (CEST)
- INSEE/Postal code: 76714 /76430
- ^{1} French Land Register data, which excludes lakes, ponds, glaciers > 1 km^{2} (0.386 sq mi or 247 acres) and river estuaries.

Les Trois-Pierres (French pronunciation: [le tʁwɑ pjɛʁ]; literally 'The Three Stones") is a commune in the Seine-Maritime department in the Normandy region in northern France.

== Geography ==
It is a farming village in the Pays de Caux, some 15 miles (24 km) east of Le Havre, at the junction of the D9015, D34 and D910 roads.

== Heraldry ==
Arms of Les Trois-Pierres	The arms of the commune of Les Trois-Pierres are blazoned : Azure, a fess argent charged with 3 stalks of wheat vert, in chief a sun Or between 2 seagulls volant respectant, and in base 3 stones argent.

== Population ==
Historical population
Year	Pop.	±% p.a.
1968	337	—
1975	391	+2.15%
1982	595	+6.18%
1990	686	+1.79%
1999	723	+0.59%
2007	715	−0.14%
2012	710	−0.14%
2017	751	+1.13%
2023	832	+1.72%
Source: INSEE

== Places of interest ==
- The church of St. Pierre, dating from the thirteenth century.

== See also ==
- Communes of the Seine-Maritime department
