= Sainneville =

- Commune
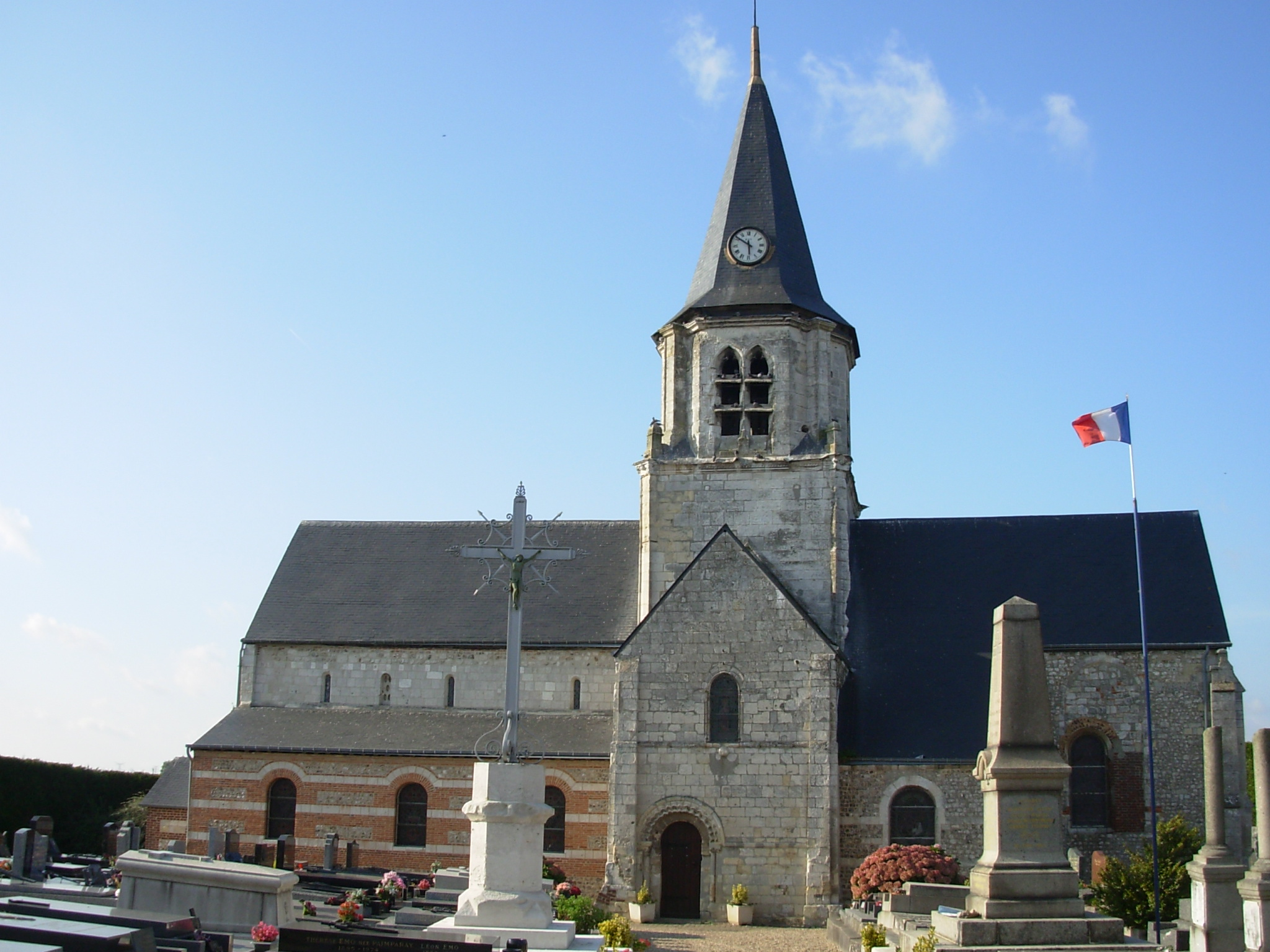
- The church in Sainneville
- Location of Sainneville
- Location within France Location within Normandy
- Coordinates: 49°33′26″N 0°17′17″E
- Country: France
- Region: Normandy
- Department: Seine-Maritime
- Arrondissement: Le Havre
- Canton: Saint-Romain-de-Colbosc
- Intercommunality: Le Havre Seine Métropole

Government
  - Mayor (2026–32): Denis Merville
- Area^{1}: 6.97 km^{2} (2.69 sq mi)
- Elevation: 100 m (330 ft)
- Highest elevation: 118 m (387 ft)
- Lowest elevation: 54 m (177 ft)
- Population (2023): 891
  - Density: 128/km^{2} (331/sq mi)
- Time zone: UTC+01:00 (CET)
  - Summer (DST): UTC+02:00 (CEST)
- INSEE/Postal code: 76551 /76430
- ^{1} French Land Register data, which excludes lakes, ponds, glaciers > 1 km^{2} (0.386 sq mi or 247 acres) and river estuaries.

Sainneville (French pronunciation: [sɛnvil]) is a commune in the Seine-Maritime department in the Normandy region in northern France.

== Geography ==
A farming village in the Pays de Caux, situated some 11 miles (18 km) northeast of Le Havre, at the junction of the D31 and D234 roads.

== Population ==
Historical population
Year	Pop.	±% p.a.
1968	485	—
1975	576	+2.49%
1982	672	+2.23%
1990	814	+2.43%
1999	826	+0.16%
2007	821	−0.08%
2012	814	−0.17%
2017	846	+0.77%
2023	891	+0.87%
Source: INSEE

== Places of interest ==
- The church of St. Maclou, dating from the twelfth century.

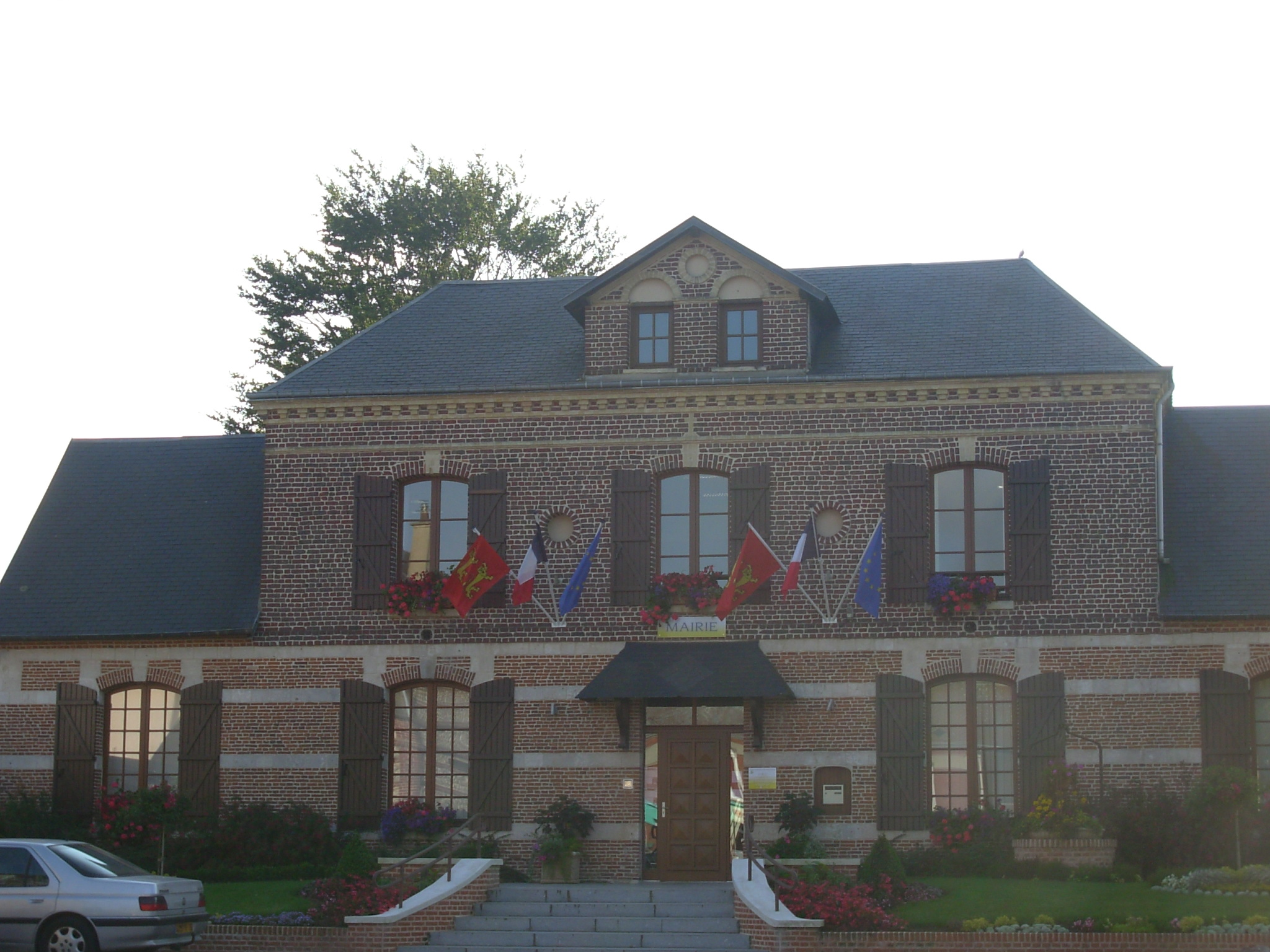
The mairie (town hall)

== See also ==
- Communes of the Seine-Maritime department
