= Saint-Vincent-Cramesnil =

- Commune
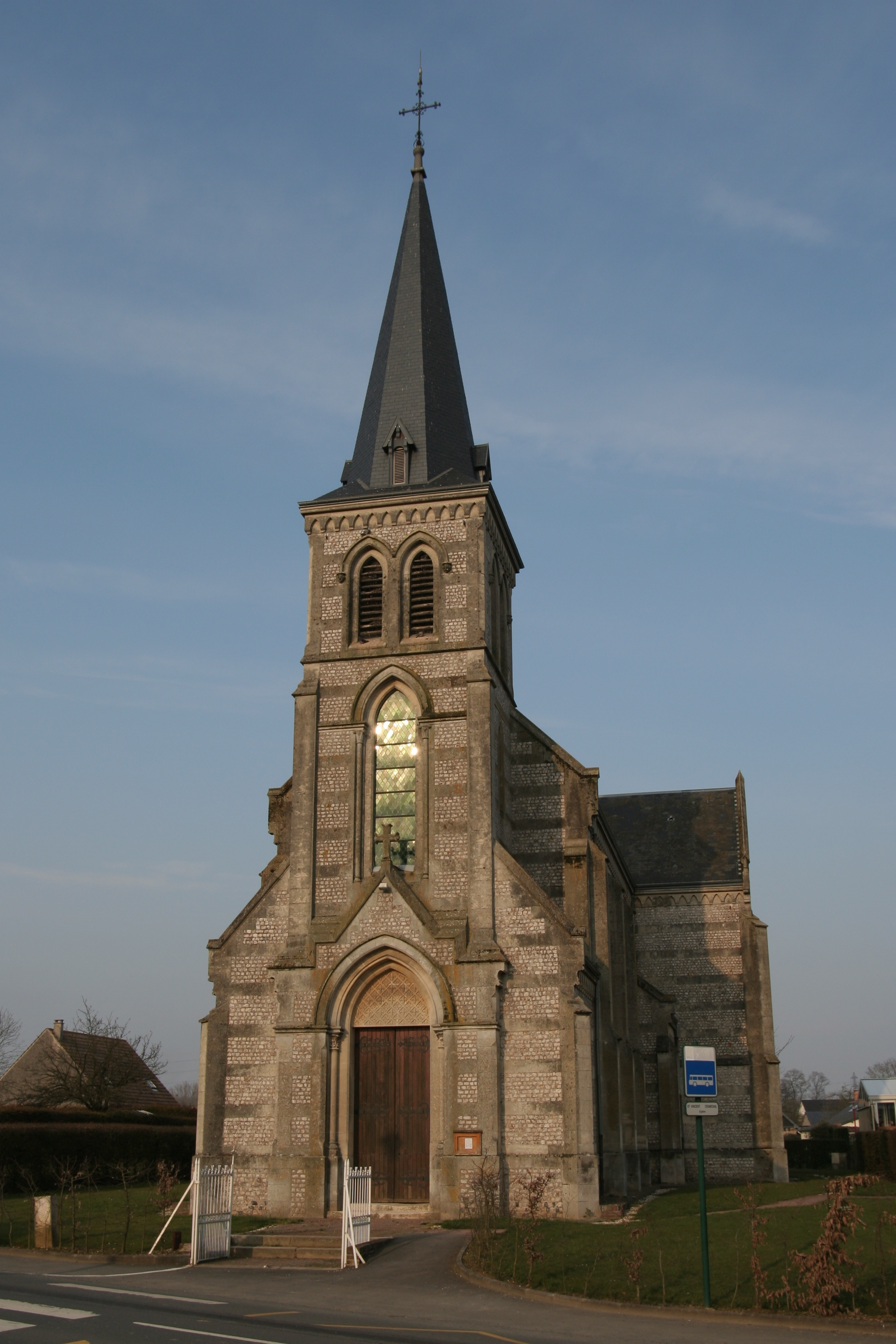
- The church in Saint-Vincent-Cramesnil
- Location of Saint-Vincent-Cramesnil
- Location within France Location within Normandy
- Coordinates: 49°30′18″N 0°21′46″E
- Country: France
- Region: Normandy
- Department: Seine-Maritime
- Arrondissement: Le Havre
- Canton: Saint-Romain-de-Colbosc
- Intercommunality: Le Havre Seine Métropole

Government
  - Mayor (2020–2026): Jocelyne Daniel
- Area^{1}: 4.77 km^{2} (1.84 sq mi)
- Elevation: 117 m (384 ft)
- Highest elevation: 125 m (410 ft)
- Lowest elevation: 40 m (130 ft)
- Population (2023): 689
  - Density: 144/km^{2} (374/sq mi)
- Time zone: UTC+01:00 (CET)
  - Summer (DST): UTC+02:00 (CEST)
- INSEE/Postal code: 76658 /76430
- ^{1} French Land Register data, which excludes lakes, ponds, glaciers > 1 km^{2} (0.386 sq mi or 247 acres) and river estuaries.

Saint-Vincent-Cramesnil (French pronunciation: [sɛ̃ vɛ̃sɑ̃ kʁamenil]) is a commune in the Seine-Maritime department in the Normandy region in northern France.

== Geography ==
A farming village, in the Pays de Caux, situated some 12 miles (19 km) east of Le Havre, at the junction of the D10 and D80 roads. It's on the route of the Tour de Normandie cycle race, a qualifying race for the Tour de France.

== Population ==
Historical population
Year	Pop.	±% p.a.
1968	279	—
1975	314	+1.70%
1982	390	+3.14%
1990	466	+2.25%
1999	501	+0.81%
2007	591	+2.09%
2012	617	+0.86%
2017	655	+1.20%
2023	689	+0.85%
Source: INSEE

== Places of interest ==
- The twelfth century church of St. Vincent.
- The château of Cramesnil, which belongs to the "du Douet de Graville" family.
- CâtilIon chateau.
- Two one-room school houses.

== See also ==
- Communes of the Seine-Maritime department
