= La Remuée =

- Commune
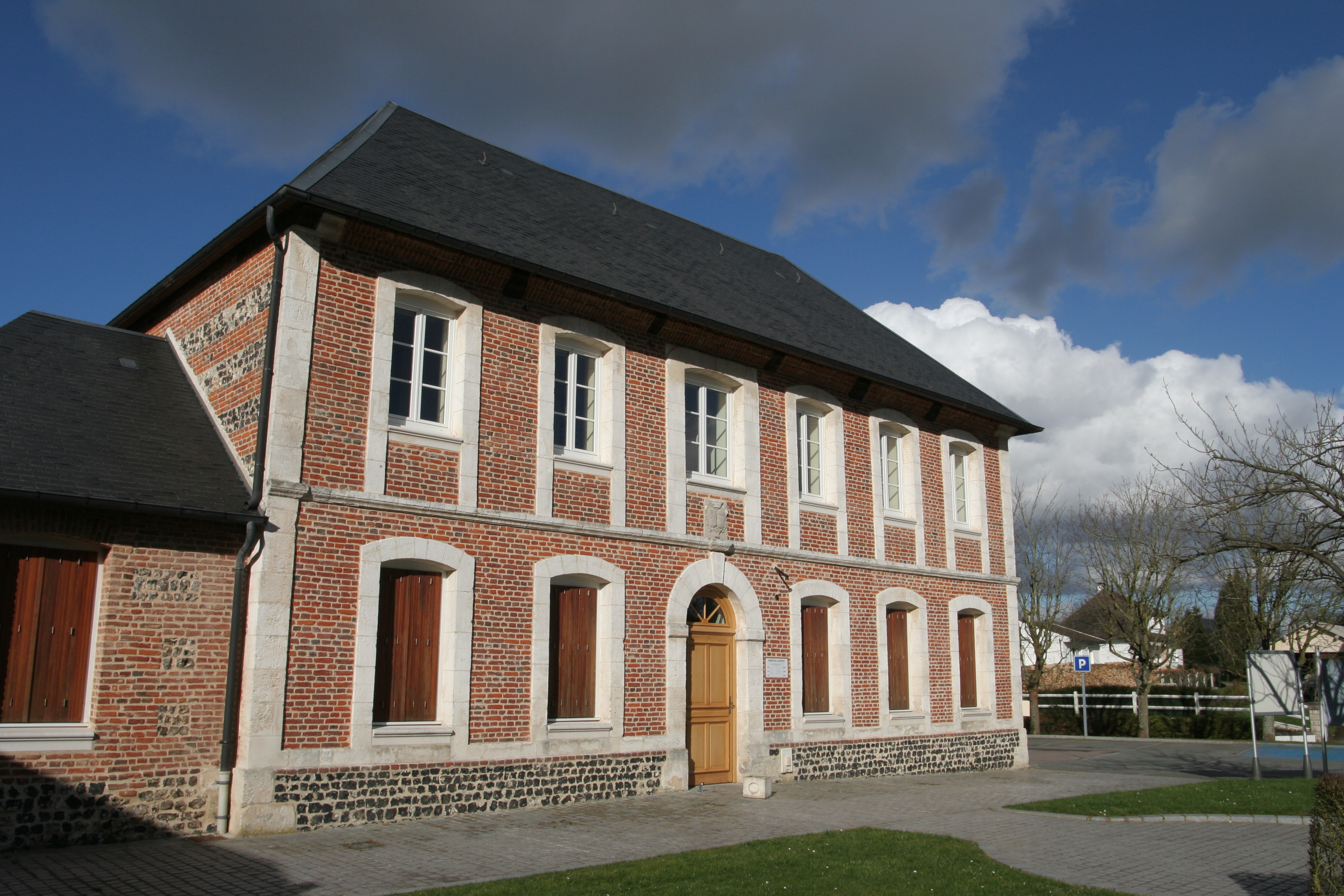
- The town hall in La Remuée

- Coat of arms
- Location of La Remuée
- Location within France Location within Normandy
- Coordinates: 49°31′43″N 0°24′15″E
- Country: France
- Region: Normandy
- Department: Seine-Maritime
- Arrondissement: Le Havre
- Canton: Saint-Romain-de-Colbosc
- Intercommunality: Le Havre Seine Métropole

Government
  - Mayor (2026–32): Nadège Courche
- Area^{1}: 7.03 km^{2} (2.71 sq mi)
- Elevation: 129 m (423 ft)
- Highest elevation: 135 m (443 ft)
- Lowest elevation: 103 m (338 ft)
- Population (2023): 1,277
  - Density: 182/km^{2} (470/sq mi)
- Time zone: UTC+01:00 (CET)
  - Summer (DST): UTC+02:00 (CEST)
- INSEE/Postal code: 76522 /76430
- ^{1} French Land Register data, which excludes lakes, ponds, glaciers > 1 km^{2} (0.386 sq mi or 247 acres) and river estuaries.

La Remuée (French pronunciation: [la ʁəmɥe]) is a commune in the Seine-Maritime department in the Normandy region in northern France.

== Geography ==
A farming village in the Pays de Caux, some 10 miles (16 km) east of Le Havre, at the junction of the D112 and D81 roads.

== Heraldry ==
Arms of La Remuée	The arms of La Remuée are blazoned : Gules, 2 swords in saltire argent between 4 martlets Or.

== Population ==
Historical population
Year	Pop.	±% p.a.
1968	484	—
1975	640	+4.07%
1982	711	+1.51%
1990	861	+2.42%
1999	1,176	+3.52%
2007	1,335	+1.60%
2012	1,320	−0.23%
2017	1,284	−0.55%
2023	1,277	−0.09%
Source: INSEE

== Places of interest ==
- The church of St. Thomas, dating from the nineteenth century.
- Notre-Dame church, dating from the thirteenth century.
- The chateau de Marefosse.

== See also ==
- Communes of the Seine-Maritime department
