= Le Havre Seine Métropole =

Coordinates: 46.58°N 0.34°E

- Communauté urbaine
- Location within the Seine-Maritime department
- Country: France
- Region: Normandy
- Department: Seine-Maritime
- No. of communes: {{{nbcomm}}}
- Established: 1 January 2019

Government
  - President: Édouard Philippe
- Area: 495.8 km^{2} (191.4 sq mi)
- Population (2018): 268,912
  - Density: 542.4/km^{2} (1,405/sq mi)
- Website: www.lehavreseinemetropole.fr

Le Havre Seine Métropole is the communauté urbaine, an intercommunal structure, centred on the city of Le Havre. It is located in the Seine-Maritime department, in the Normandy region, northwestern France. It was created on 1 January 2019 by the merger of the former Agglomeration community of Le Havre and the communautés de communes Canton de Criquetot-l'Esneval and Caux Estuaire. Its area is 495.8 km^{2}. Its population was 268,912 in 2018, of which 169,733 in Le Havre proper.

== Composition ==
The communauté urbaine consists of the following 54 communes:

1. Angerville-l'Orcher
2. Anglesqueville-l'Esneval
3. Beaurepaire
4. Bénouville
5. Bordeaux-Saint-Clair
6. Cauville-sur-Mer
7. La Cerlangue
8. Criquetot-l'Esneval
9. Cuverville
10. Épouville
11. Épretot
12. Étainhus
13. Étretat
14. Fongueusemare
15. Fontaine-la-Mallet
16. Fontenay
17. Gainneville
18. Gommerville
19. Gonfreville-l'Orcher
20. Gonneville-la-Mallet
21. Graimbouville
22. Harfleur
23. Le Havre
24. Hermeville
25. Heuqueville
26. Manéglise
27. Mannevillette
28. Montivilliers
29. Notre-Dame-du-Bec
30. Octeville-sur-Mer
31. Oudalle
32. Pierrefiques
33. La Poterie-Cap-d'Antifer
34. La Remuée
35. Rogerville
36. Rolleville
37. Sainneville
38. Saint-Aubin-Routot
39. Sainte-Adresse
40. Sainte-Marie-au-Bosc
41. Saint-Gilles-de-la-Neuville
42. Saint-Jouin-Bruneval
43. Saint-Laurent-de-Brèvedent
44. Saint-Martin-du-Bec
45. Saint-Martin-du-Manoir
46. Saint-Romain-de-Colbosc
47. Saint-Vigor-d'Ymonville
48. Saint-Vincent-Cramesnil
49. Sandouville
50. Le Tilleul
51. Les Trois-Pierres
52. Turretot
53. Vergetot
54. Villainville

== Organization ==
=== Elected members ===
The communauté urbaine is administered by its conseil communautaire, composed of 130 municipal councilors representing the 54 members communes distributed by municipal population as follows:

| Number of councilors | Communes |
|---|---|
| 59 | Le Havre |
| 8 | Montivilliers |
| 4 | Gonfreville-l'Orcher & Harfleur |
| 3 | Octeville-sur-Mer & Sainte-Adresse |
| 2 | Saint-Romain-de-Colbosc |
| 1 (+1 substitute) | Remaining communes |

=== List of presidents ===
List of successive presidents of Le Havre Seine Métropole
| In office | | Name | Party | | Capacity | Ref. |
|---|---|---|---|---|---|---|
| 1 January 2019 | 5 April 2019 | Luc Lemonnier | LR | | | |
| 5 April 2019 | 5 July 2020 | Jean-Baptiste Gastinne | LR | | | |
| 5 July 2020 | Incumbent | Édouard Philippe | DVD | General councilor of Seine-Maritime (2008—2012) Regional councilor of Haute-Normandie (2004—2008) President of the agglomerated community of Le Havre (2010—2017) Deputy for Seine-Martime's 7th constituency (2012—2017) Prime Minister (2017—2020) Mayor of Le Havre (2010—2017, then 2020—present) | | |
