= Canton of Octeville-sur-Mer =

Coordinates: 49.55°N 0.12°E

- Canton
- Situation of the canton of Octeville-sur-Mer in the department of Seine-Maritime
- Country: France
- Region: Normandy
- Department: Seine-Maritime
- No. of communes: {{{nbcomm}}}
- Population (2023): 36,936
- INSEE code: 7626

The canton of Octeville-sur-Mer is an administrative division of the Seine-Maritime department, in northern France. It was created at the French canton reorganisation which came into effect in March 2015. Its seat is in Octeville-sur-Mer.

It consists of the following communes:

1. Angerville-l'Orcher
2. Anglesqueville-l'Esneval
3. Beaurepaire
4. Bénouville
5. Bordeaux-Saint-Clair
6. Cauville-sur-Mer
7. Criquetot-l'Esneval
8. Cuverville
9. Épouville
10. Étretat
11. Fongueusemare
12. Fontaine-la-Mallet
13. Fontenay
14. Gonneville-la-Mallet
15. Hermeville
16. Heuqueville
17. Manéglise
18. Mannevillette
19. Notre-Dame-du-Bec
20. Octeville-sur-Mer
21. Pierrefiques
22. La Poterie-Cap-d'Antifer
23. Rolleville
24. Sainte-Marie-au-Bosc
25. Saint-Jouin-Bruneval
26. Saint-Martin-du-Bec
27. Saint-Martin-du-Manoir
28. Le Tilleul
29. Turretot
30. Vergetot
31. Villainville
