= Saint-Jouin-Bruneval =

- Commune
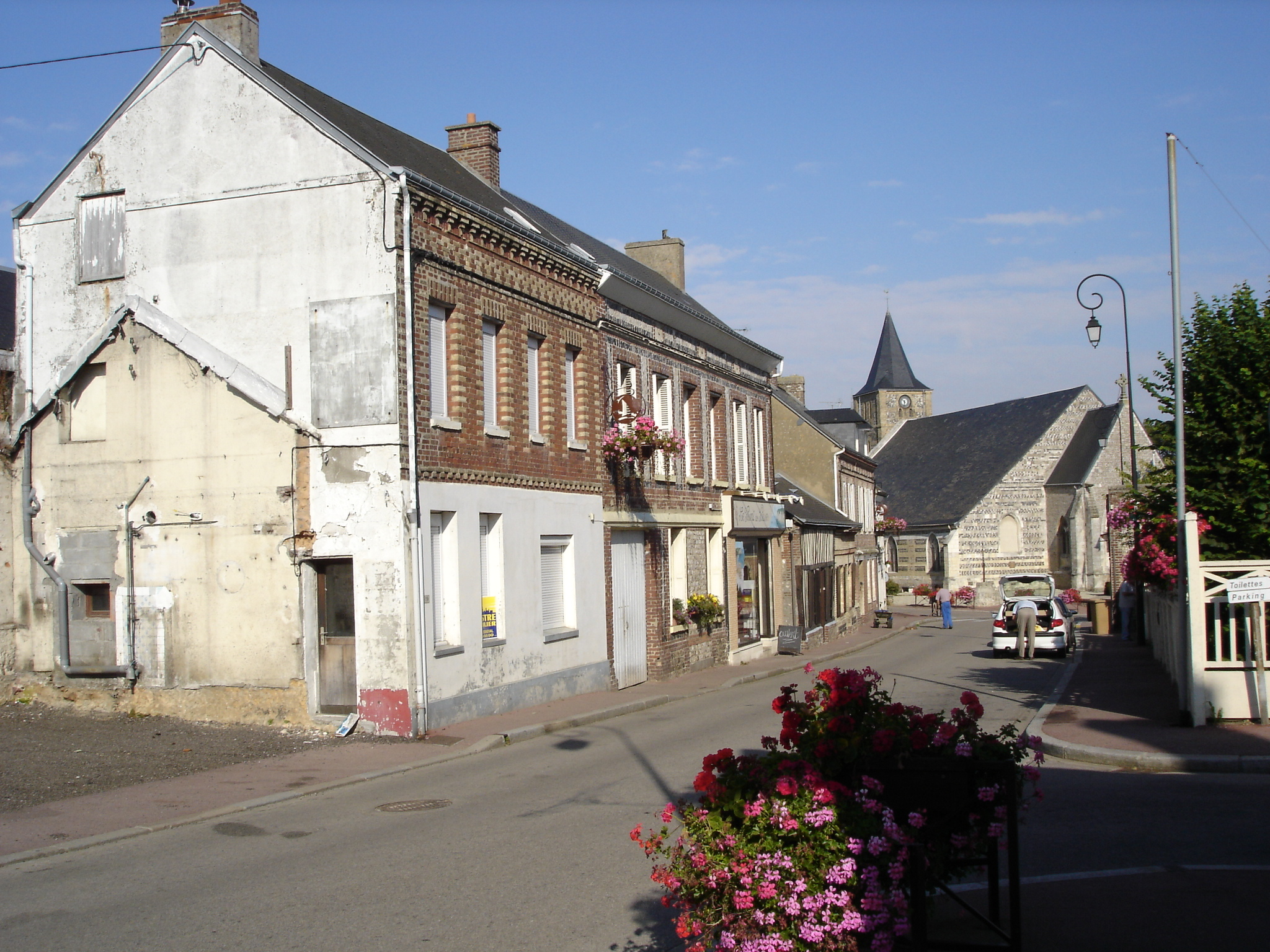
- A view of the town centre
- Location of Saint-Jouin-Bruneval
- Location within France Location within Normandy
- Coordinates: 49°38′38″N 0°09′49″E
- Country: France
- Region: Normandy
- Department: Seine-Maritime
- Arrondissement: Le Havre
- Canton: Octeville-sur-Mer
- Intercommunality: Le Havre Seine Métropole

Government
  - Mayor (2026–32): François Auber
- Area^{1}: 18.82 km^{2} (7.27 sq mi)
- Elevation: 120 m (390 ft)
- Highest elevation: 137 m (449 ft)
- Lowest elevation: 0 m (0 ft)
- Population (2023): 1,816
  - Density: 96.49/km^{2} (249.9/sq mi)
- Time zone: UTC+01:00 (CET)
  - Summer (DST): UTC+02:00 (CEST)
- INSEE/Postal code: 76595 /76280
- ^{1} French Land Register data, which excludes lakes, ponds, glaciers > 1 km^{2} (0.386 sq mi or 247 acres) and river estuaries.

Saint-Jouin-Bruneval (French pronunciation: [sɛ̃ ʒwɛ̃ bʁynval]) is a commune in the Seine-Maritime department in the Normandy region in northern France.

== Geography ==
A farming village in the Pays de Caux, situated some 14 miles (23 km) north of Le Havre, at the junction of the D940, D139 and D111 roads. France's 2nd largest oil-tanker port (built 1973-1975) and oil depot of ‘’Havre-Antifer’’ is entirely within the borders of the commune.

== History ==
During World War II, Operation Biting (also known as the Bruneval Raid) was a successful Combined Operations raid to capture components of a German Würzburg radar set at La Poterie-Cap-d'Antifer and evacuated by the Bruneval beach on 27/28 February 1942.

== Population ==
Historical population
Year	Pop.	±% p.a.
1968	880	—
1975	913	+0.53%
1982	1,227	+4.31%
1990	1,437	+1.99%
1999	1,576	+1.03%
2007	1,798	+1.66%
2012	1,868	+0.77%
2017	1,869	+0.01%
2023	1,816	−0.48%
Source: INSEE

== See also ==
- Communes of the Seine-Maritime department
