= Fongueusemare =

- Commune
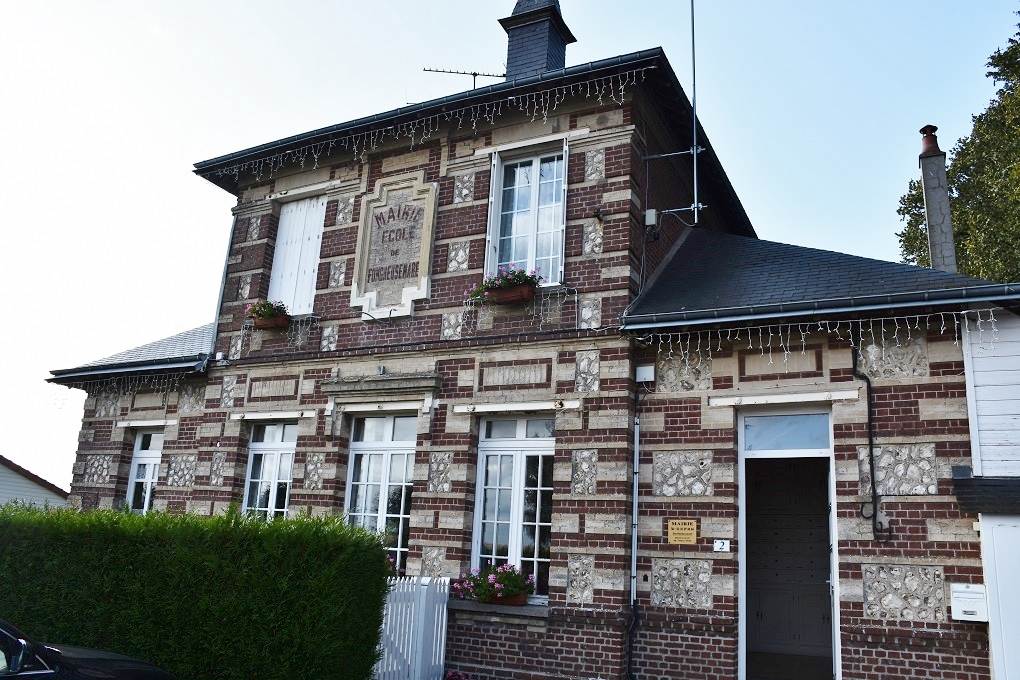
- The town hall in Fongueusemare

- Coat of arms
- Location of Fongueusemare
- Location within France Location within Normandy
- Coordinates: 49°40′45″N 0°18′22″E
- Country: France
- Region: Normandy
- Department: Seine-Maritime
- Arrondissement: Le Havre
- Canton: Octeville-sur-Mer
- Intercommunality: Le Havre Seine Métropole

Government
  - Mayor (2026–32): Valérie Petit
- Area^{1}: 11.85 km^{2} (4.58 sq mi)
- Elevation: 115 m (377 ft)
- Highest elevation: 136 m (446 ft)
- Lowest elevation: 37 m (121 ft)
- Population (2023): 175
  - Density: 14.8/km^{2} (38.2/sq mi)
- Time zone: UTC+01:00 (CET)
  - Summer (DST): UTC+02:00 (CEST)
- INSEE/Postal code: 76268 /76280
- ^{1} French Land Register data, which excludes lakes, ponds, glaciers > 1 km^{2} (0.386 sq mi or 247 acres) and river estuaries.

Fongueusemare (French pronunciation: [fɔ̃ɡøzmaʁ]) is a commune in the Seine-Maritime department in the Normandy region in northern France.

== Geography ==
A small farming and woodland village situated in the Pays de Caux, some 16 miles (26 km) northeast of Le Havre, at the junction of the D72 and the D79 roads.

== Heraldry ==
Arms of Fongueusemare	The arms of Fongueusemare are blazoned : Azure, two abbot's croziers in saltire, between a garb and 3 gables (from tithing barns) Or

== Population ==
Historical population
Year	Pop.	±% p.a.
1968	162	—
1975	156	−0.54%
1982	160	+0.36%
1990	170	+0.76%
1999	170	+0.00%
2007	189	+1.33%
2012	185	−0.43%
2017	189	+0.43%
2023	175	−1.27%
Source: INSEE

== Places of interest ==
- The chapel of Sainte-Thérèse, built in 1927.

== In fiction and popular culture ==
Much of the action in André Gide's book Strait Is the Gate is set in the home of the Bucolin family at Fongueusemare.

== See also ==
- Communes of the Seine-Maritime department
