= Bordeaux-Saint-Clair =

- Commune
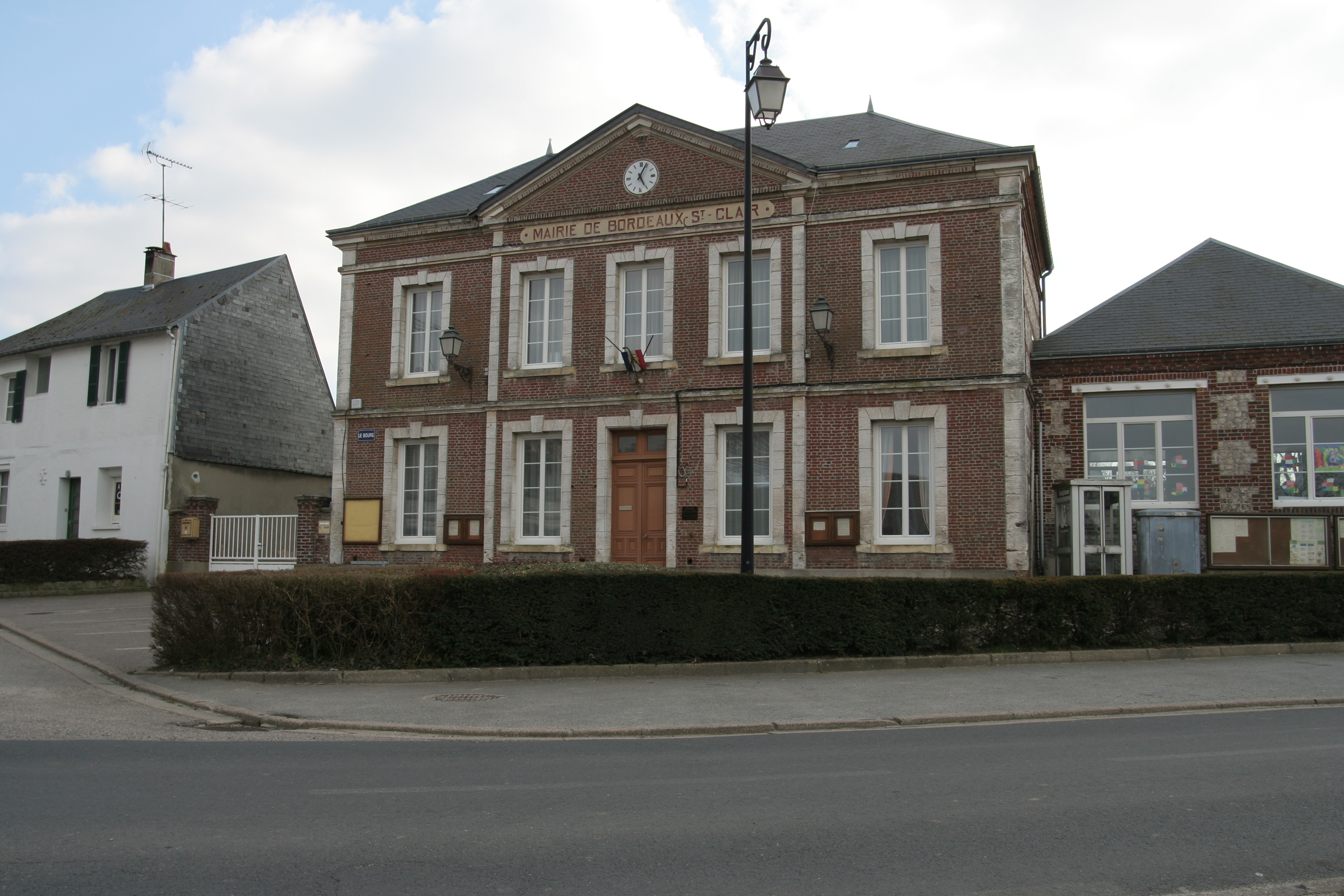
- The town hall in Bordeaux-Saint-Clair

- Coat of arms
- Location of Bordeaux-Saint-Clair
- Location within France Location within Normandy
- Coordinates: 49°42′06″N 0°15′14″E
- Country: France
- Region: Normandy
- Department: Seine-Maritime
- Arrondissement: Le Havre
- Canton: Octeville-sur-Mer
- Intercommunality: Le Havre Seine Métropole

Government
  - Mayor (2020–2026): Jean-Pierre Bonneville
- Area^{1}: 10.31 km^{2} (3.98 sq mi)
- Elevation: 102 m (335 ft)
- Highest elevation: 119 m (390 ft)
- Lowest elevation: 10 m (33 ft)
- Population (2023): 658
  - Density: 63.8/km^{2} (165/sq mi)
- Time zone: UTC+01:00 (CET)
  - Summer (DST): UTC+02:00 (CEST)
- INSEE/Postal code: 76117 /76790
- ^{1} French Land Register data, which excludes lakes, ponds, glaciers > 1 km^{2} (0.386 sq mi or 247 acres) and river estuaries.

Bordeaux-Saint-Clair (French pronunciation: [bɔʁdo sɛ̃ klɛːʁ]) is a commune in the Seine-Maritime department in the Normandy region in northern France.

== Geography ==
Bordeaux-Saint-Clair is a farming village situated in the Pays de Caux, some 15 miles (24 km) northeast of Le Havre, served by the D940 road between Fécamp and Etretat. The village is around 200 km away from Paris.

=== Heraldry ===
Arms of Bordeaux-Saint-Clair	The arms of Bordeaux-Saint-Clair are blazoned: Per fess 1: Azure, the town hall argent masonned sable, to sinister a bust of St. Clair argent haloed Or; 2: Gules, cross couped and a vase Or.

== Population ==
Historical population
Year	Pop.	±% p.a.
1968	352	—
1975	380	+1.10%
1982	538	+5.09%
1990	525	−0.31%
1999	566	+0.84%
2007	587	+0.46%
2012	655	+2.22%
2017	666	+0.33%
2023	658	−0.20%
Source: INSEE

== Places of interest ==
- A 16th-century manorhouse and its park.
- Two churches, with parts dating from the 12th century

== See also ==
- Communes of the Seine-Maritime department
