= Pierrefiques =

- Commune
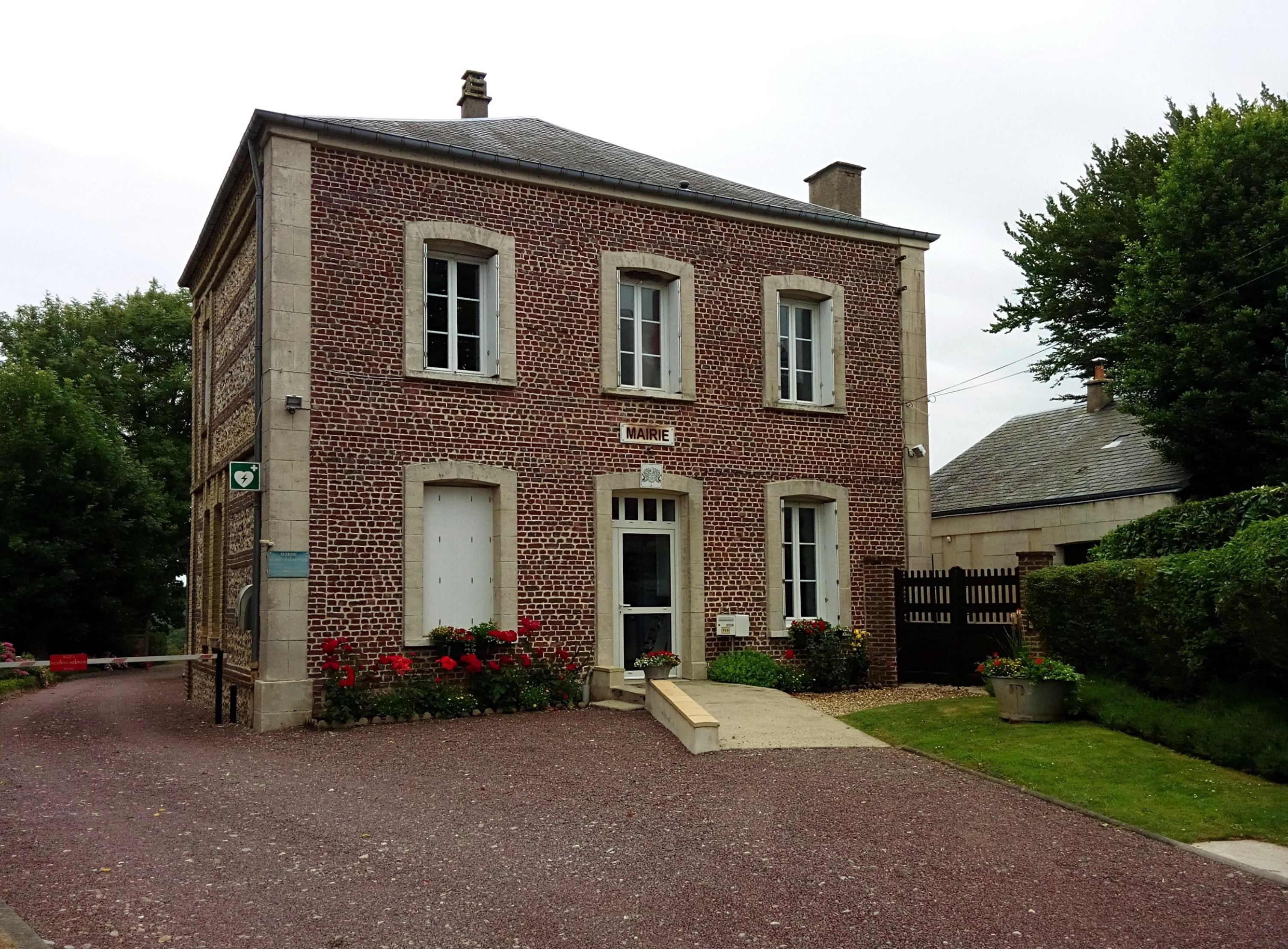
- The town hall in Pierrefiques

- Coat of arms
- Location of Pierrefiques
- Location within France Location within Normandy
- Coordinates: 49°40′18″N 0°13′59″E
- Country: France
- Region: Normandy
- Department: Seine-Maritime
- Arrondissement: Le Havre
- Canton: Octeville-sur-Mer
- Intercommunality: Le Havre Seine Métropole

Government
  - Mayor (2020–2026): Pascal Coutey
- Area^{1}: 2.31 km^{2} (0.89 sq mi)
- Elevation: 90 m (300 ft)
- Highest elevation: 107 m (351 ft)
- Lowest elevation: 15 m (49 ft)
- Population (2023): 128
  - Density: 55.4/km^{2} (144/sq mi)
- Time zone: UTC+01:00 (CET)
  - Summer (DST): UTC+02:00 (CEST)
- INSEE/Postal code: 76501 /76280
- ^{1} French Land Register data, which excludes lakes, ponds, glaciers > 1 km^{2} (0.386 sq mi or 247 acres) and river estuaries.

Pierrefiques (French pronunciation: [pjɛʁfik]) is a commune in the Seine-Maritime department in the Normandy region in northern France.

== Geography ==
A small farming village in the Pays de Caux, situated some 15 miles (24 km) northeast of Le Havre, just off the D139 road.

== Population ==
Historical population
Year	Pop.	±% p.a.
1968	91	—
1975	79	−2.00%
1982	85	+1.05%
1990	97	+1.66%
1999	106	+0.99%
2007	123	+1.88%
2012	140	+2.62%
2017	135	−0.72%
2023	128	−0.88%
Source: INSEE

== Places of interest ==
- The church of St. Jean-Baptiste, dating from the sixteenth century.

== See also ==
- Communes of the Seine-Maritime department
