= Anglesqueville-l'Esneval =

Anglesqueville-l’Esneval
- Commune
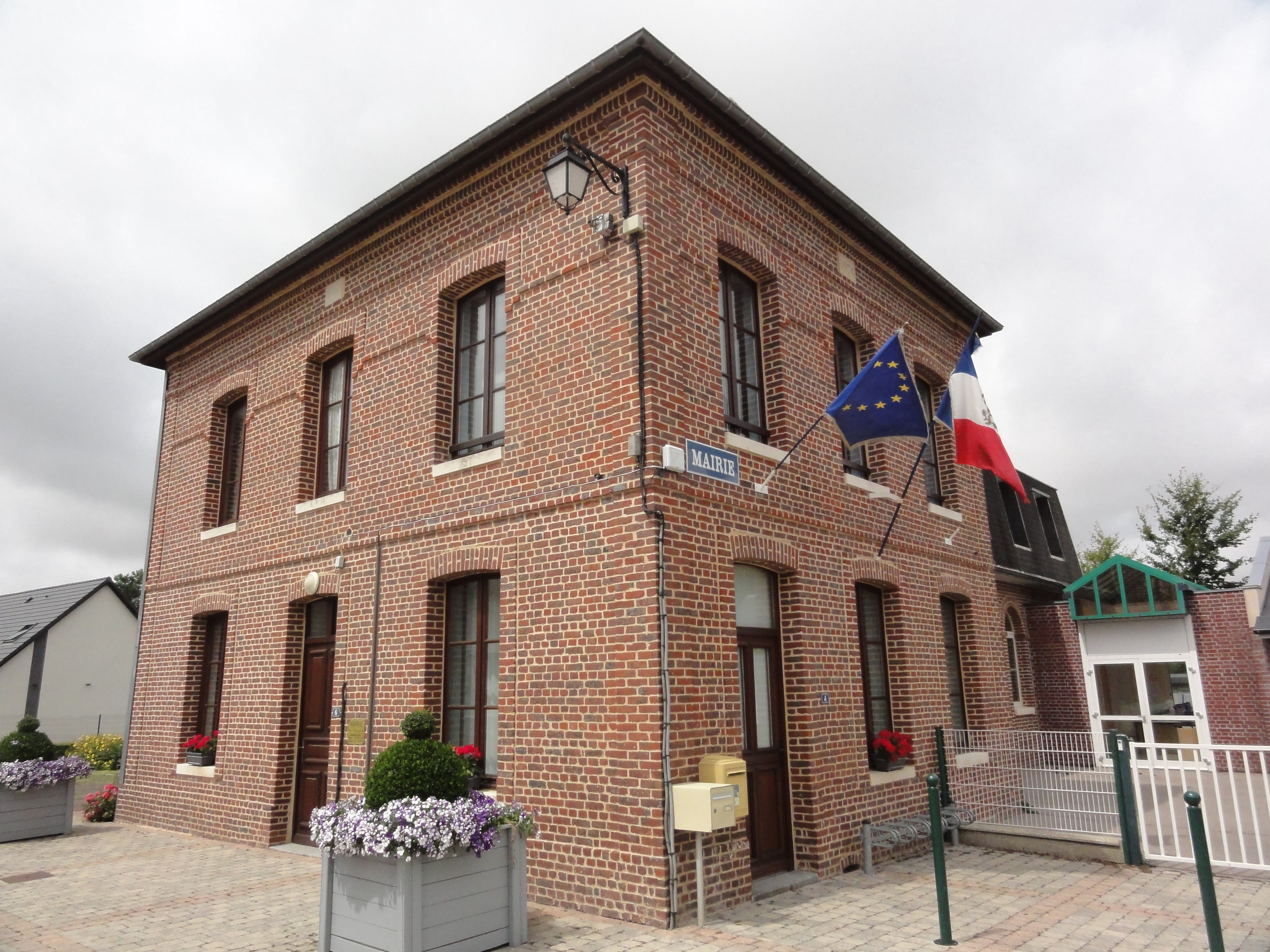
- Town hall

- Coat of arms
- Location of Anglesqueville-l’Esneval
- Location within France Location within Normandy
- Coordinates: 49°38′02″N 0°14′16″E
- Country: France
- Region: Normandy
- Department: Seine-Maritime
- Arrondissement: Le Havre
- Canton: Octeville-sur-Mer
- Intercommunality: Le Havre Seine Métropole

Government
  - Mayor (2020–2026): Patrick Lefebvre
- Area^{1}: 4.36 km^{2} (1.68 sq mi)
- Elevation: 130 m (430 ft)
- Highest elevation: 133 m (436 ft)
- Lowest elevation: 79 m (259 ft)
- Population (2023): 678
  - Density: 156/km^{2} (403/sq mi)
- Time zone: UTC+01:00 (CET)
  - Summer (DST): UTC+02:00 (CEST)
- INSEE/Postal code: 76017 /76280
- ^{1} French Land Register data, which excludes lakes, ponds, glaciers > 1 km^{2} (0.386 sq mi or 247 acres) and river estuaries.

Anglesqueville-l’Esneval is a commune in the Seine-Maritime department in the Normandy region in northern France.

== Geography ==
A farming village situated in the Pays de Caux, some 11 miles (18 km) north of Le Havre, at the junction of the D139 and the D125.

== Heraldry ==
| Anglesqueville-l'Esneval | The arms of Anglesqueville-l'Esneval are blazoned : Per pale azure and gules, a chevron Or between an escallop, a lion and a spear head argent. |

== Population ==
Historical population
| Year | Pop. | ±% p.a. |
|---|---|---|
| 1968 | 188 | — |
| 1975 | 216 | +2.00% |
| 1982 | 321 | +5.82% |
| 1990 | 372 | +1.86% |
| 1999 | 473 | +2.70% |
| 2007 | 509 | +0.92% |
| 2012 | 544 | +1.34% |
| 2017 | 598 | +1.91% |
| 2023 | 678 | +2.11% |
Source: INSEE

== Places of interest ==
- The church of St.Martin, with parts dating from the eleventh century.

== See also ==
- Communes of the Seine-Maritime department
