= Turretot =

- Commune
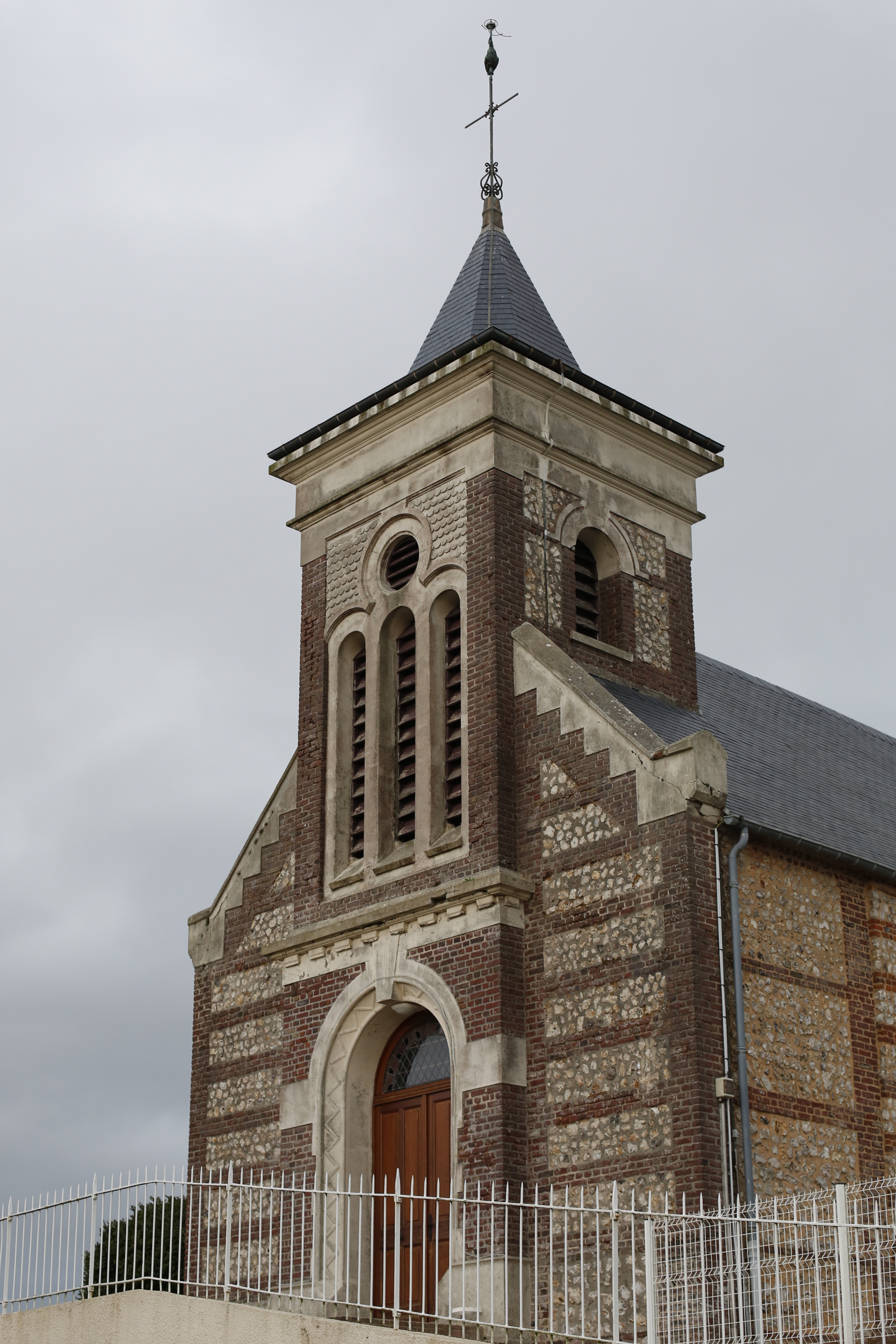
- The church in Turretot

- Coat of arms
- Location of Turretot
- Location within France Location within Normandy
- Coordinates: 49°36′29″N 0°13′41″E
- Country: France
- Region: Normandy
- Department: Seine-Maritime
- Arrondissement: Le Havre
- Canton: Octeville-sur-Mer
- Intercommunality: Le Havre Seine Métropole

Government
  - Mayor (2026–32): Philippe Durécu
- Area^{1}: 6.07 km^{2} (2.34 sq mi)
- Elevation: 104 m (341 ft)
- Highest elevation: 122 m (400 ft)
- Lowest elevation: 70 m (230 ft)
- Population (2023): 1,619
  - Density: 267/km^{2} (691/sq mi)
- Time zone: UTC+01:00 (CET)
  - Summer (DST): UTC+02:00 (CEST)
- INSEE/Postal code: 76716 /76280
- ^{1} French Land Register data, which excludes lakes, ponds, glaciers > 1 km^{2} (0.386 sq mi or 247 acres) and river estuaries.

Turretot (French pronunciation: [tyʁto]) is a commune in the Seine-Maritime department in the Normandy region in northern France.

== Geography ==
A farming village in the Pays de Caux, situated some 12 miles (19 km) northeast of Le Havre, at the junction of the D78 and D125e roads.

== Population ==
Historical population
Year	Pop.	±% p.a.
1968	284	—
1975	587	+10.93%
1982	1,157	+10.18%
1990	1,178	+0.23%
1999	1,315	+1.23%
2007	1,442	+1.16%
2012	1,511	+0.94%
2017	1,469	−0.56%
2023	1,619	+1.63%
Source: INSEE

== Places of interest ==
- The church of St. Anne, dating from the thirteenth century.
- The church of St. Martin, dating from the twelfth century.

== See also ==
- Communes of the Seine-Maritime department
