= Heuqueville, Seine-Maritime =

Heuqueville
- Commune
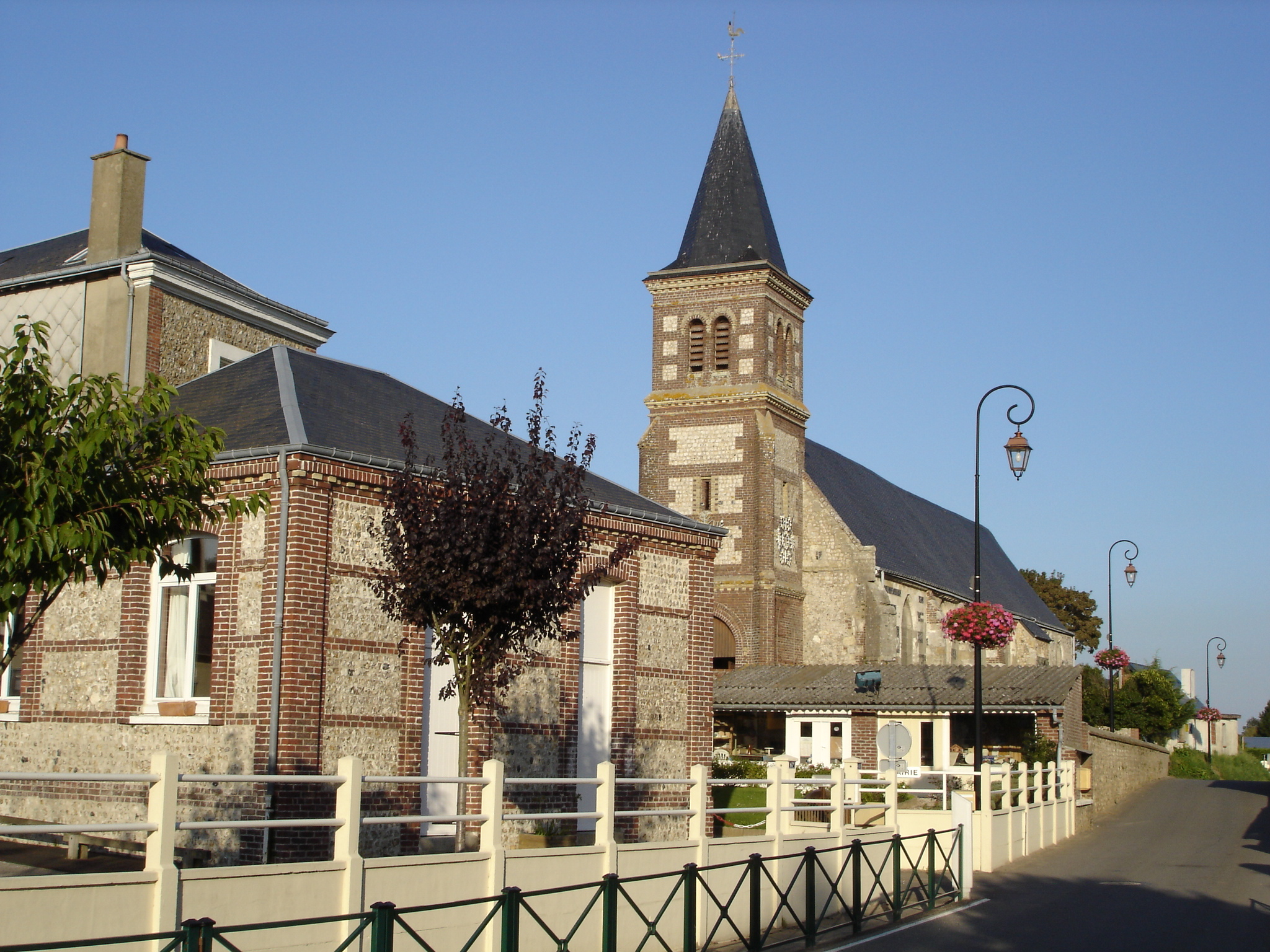
- The church in Heuqueville
- Location of Heuqueville
- Location within France Location within Normandy
- Coordinates: 49°36′59″N 0°08′59″E
- Country: France
- Region: Normandy
- Department: Seine-Maritime
- Arrondissement: Le Havre
- Canton: Octeville-sur-Mer
- Intercommunality: Le Havre Seine Métropole

Government
  - Mayor (2020–2026): Patrick Bucourt
- Area^{1}: 5.05 km^{2} (1.95 sq mi)
- Elevation: 95 m (312 ft)
- Highest elevation: 112 m (367 ft)
- Lowest elevation: 0 m (0 ft)
- Population (2023): 717
  - Density: 142/km^{2} (368/sq mi)
- Time zone: UTC+01:00 (CET)
  - Summer (DST): UTC+02:00 (CEST)
- INSEE/Postal code: 76361 /76280
- ^{1} French Land Register data, which excludes lakes, ponds, glaciers > 1 km^{2} (0.386 sq mi or 247 acres) and river estuaries.

Heuqueville (French pronunciation: [økvil]) is a commune in the Seine-Maritime department in the Normandy region in northern France.

== Geography ==
A farming village situated in the Pays de Caux, some 9 miles (14 km) north of Le Havre, at the junction of the D940 and D111 roads. The English Channel and huge limestone cliffs form the western border of the commune.

== Population ==
Historical population
Year	Pop.	±% p.a.
1968	230	—
1975	319	+4.78%
1982	440	+4.70%
1990	590	+3.73%
1999	585	−0.09%
2007	631	+0.95%
2012	696	+1.98%
2017	718	+0.62%
2023	717	−0.02%
Source: INSEE

== Places of interest ==
- The church of St.Pierre, dating in part from the sixteenth century.
- The motte of an old castle.

== See also ==
- Communes of the Seine-Maritime department
