= Sainte-Marie-au-Bosc =

- Commune
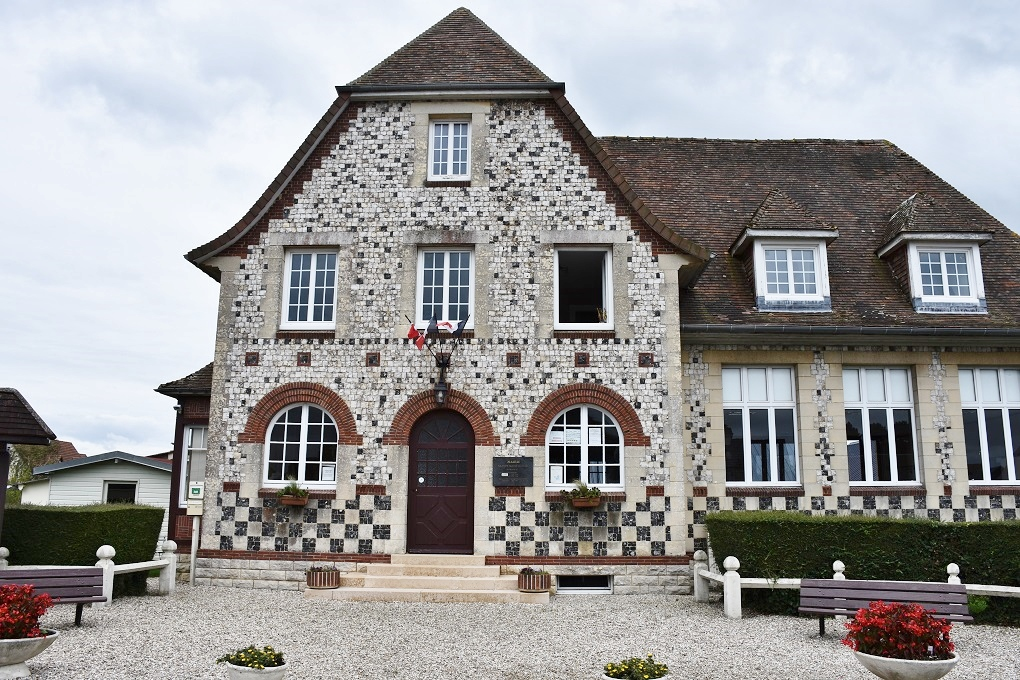
- The town hall in Sainte-Marie-au-Bosc
- Location of Sainte-Marie-au-Bosc
- Location within France Location within Normandy
- Coordinates: 49°39′54″N 0°12′09″E
- Country: France
- Region: Normandy
- Department: Seine-Maritime
- Arrondissement: Le Havre
- Canton: Octeville-sur-Mer
- Intercommunality: Le Havre Seine Métropole

Government
  - Mayor (2026–32): Étienne Planchon
- Area^{1}: 3.18 km^{2} (1.23 sq mi)
- Elevation: 100 m (330 ft)
- Highest elevation: 126 m (413 ft)
- Lowest elevation: 33 m (108 ft)
- Population (2023): 350
  - Density: 110/km^{2} (290/sq mi)
- Time zone: UTC+01:00 (CET)
  - Summer (DST): UTC+02:00 (CEST)
- INSEE/Postal code: 76609 /76280
- ^{1} French Land Register data, which excludes lakes, ponds, glaciers > 1 km^{2} (0.386 sq mi or 247 acres) and river estuaries.

Sainte-Marie-au-Bosc (French pronunciation: [sɛ̃t maʁi o bɔsk]) is a commune in the Seine-Maritime department in the Normandy region in northern France.

== Geography ==
A small farming village, in the Pays de Caux, situated some 16 miles (26 km) north of Le Havre, at the junction of the D940 and D32 roads.

== Population ==
Historical population
Year	Pop.	±% p.a.
1968	129	—
1975	138	+0.97%
1982	156	+1.77%
1990	173	+1.30%
1999	213	+2.34%
2007	297	+4.24%
2012	344	+2.98%
2017	367	+1.30%
2023	350	−0.79%
Source: INSEE

== Places of interest ==
- A farm-museum at Cotentin, dating from the seventeenth century.
- The church of St.Marie, dating from the twelfth century.

== See also ==
- Communes of the Seine-Maritime department
