= Beaurepaire, Seine-Maritime =

Beaurepaire
- Commune
- Coat of arms
- Location of Beaurepaire
- Location within France Location within Normandy
- Coordinates: 49°39′58″N 0°13′17″E
- Country: France
- Region: Normandy
- Department: Seine-Maritime
- Arrondissement: Le Havre
- Canton: Octeville-sur-Mer
- Intercommunality: Le Havre Seine Métropole
- Area^{1}: 2.83 km^{2} (1.09 sq mi)
- Elevation: 125 m (410 ft)
- Highest elevation: 132 m (433 ft)
- Lowest elevation: 47 m (154 ft)
- Population (2023): 490
  - Density: 170/km^{2} (450/sq mi)
- Time zone: UTC+01:00 (CET)
  - Summer (DST): UTC+02:00 (CEST)
- INSEE/Postal code: 76064 /76280
- ^{1} French Land Register data, which excludes lakes, ponds, glaciers > 1 km^{2} (0.386 sq mi or 247 acres) and river estuaries.

Beaurepaire is a commune in the Seine-Maritime department in the Normandy region in northern France.

== Geography ==
A farming village situated in a wooded valley in the Pays de Caux, some 11 miles (18 km) northeast of Le Havre, just off the D32 road.

== Population ==
Historical population
Year	Pop.	±% p.a.
1968	223	—
1975	197	−1.76%
1982	254	+3.70%
1990	337	+3.60%
1999	393	+1.72%
2007	435	+1.28%
2012	495	+2.62%
2017	497	+0.08%
2023	490	−0.24%
Source: INSEE

== Places of interest ==
- The church of St. Thomas, dating from the eighteenth century.
- Traces of a medieval castle.

== See also ==
- Communes of the Seine-Maritime department
