= Hermeville =

- Commune
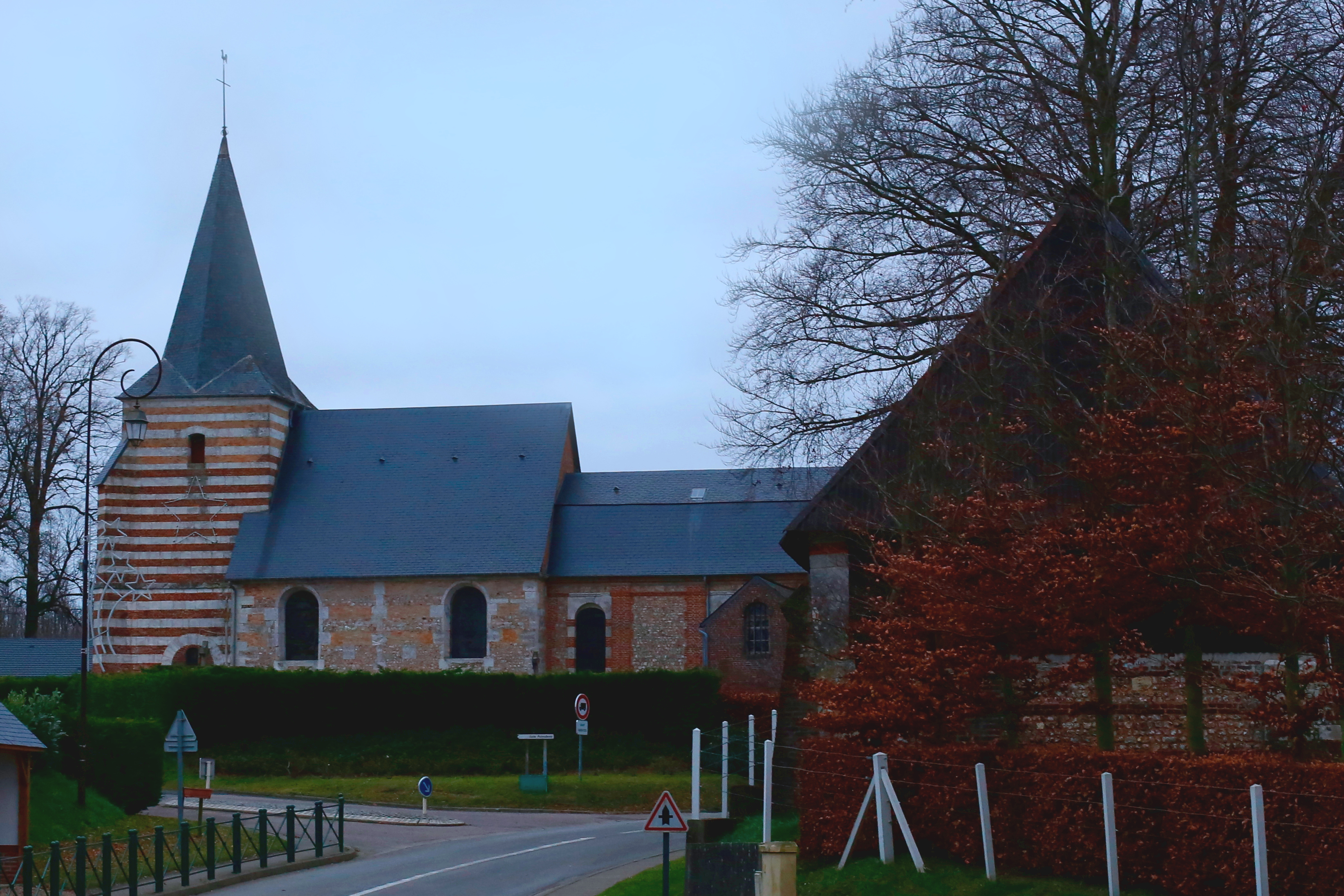
- The church in Hermeville

- Coat of arms
- Location of Hermeville
- Location within France Location within Normandy
- Coordinates: 49°35′52″N 0°15′52″E
- Country: France
- Region: Normandy
- Department: Seine-Maritime
- Arrondissement: Le Havre
- Canton: Octeville-sur-Mer
- Intercommunality: Le Havre Seine Métropole

Government
  - Mayor (2026–32): Laurent Lheureux
- Area^{1}: 3.81 km^{2} (1.47 sq mi)
- Elevation: 15 m (49 ft)
- Highest elevation: 124 m (407 ft)
- Lowest elevation: 80 m (260 ft)
- Population (2023): 362
  - Density: 95.0/km^{2} (246/sq mi)
- Time zone: UTC+01:00 (CET)
  - Summer (DST): UTC+02:00 (CEST)
- INSEE/Postal code: 76357 /76280
- ^{1} French Land Register data, which excludes lakes, ponds, glaciers > 1 km^{2} (0.386 sq mi or 247 acres) and river estuaries.

Hermeville (French pronunciation: [ɛʁməvil]) is a commune in the Seine-Maritime department in the Normandy region in northern France.

== Geography ==
A small farming village situated in the Pays de Caux, some 9 miles (14 km) northeast of Le Havre, at the junction of the D925 and D125 roads.

== Heraldry ==
Arms of Hermeville	The arms of Hermeville are blazoned : Quarterly 1: gules, a dove (descending?) Or; 2: Azure, a dove rising contourny argent; 3: Azure, a sword fesswise argent, garnished Or, and in chief a helm argent; and 4: Gules, a garb Or, tied sable.

== Population ==
Historical population
Year	Pop.	±% p.a.
1968	126	—
1975	239	+9.58%
1982	342	+5.25%
1990	357	+0.54%
1999	372	+0.46%
2007	359	−0.44%
2012	370	+0.61%
2017	366	−0.22%
2023	362	−0.18%
Source: INSEE

== Places of interest ==
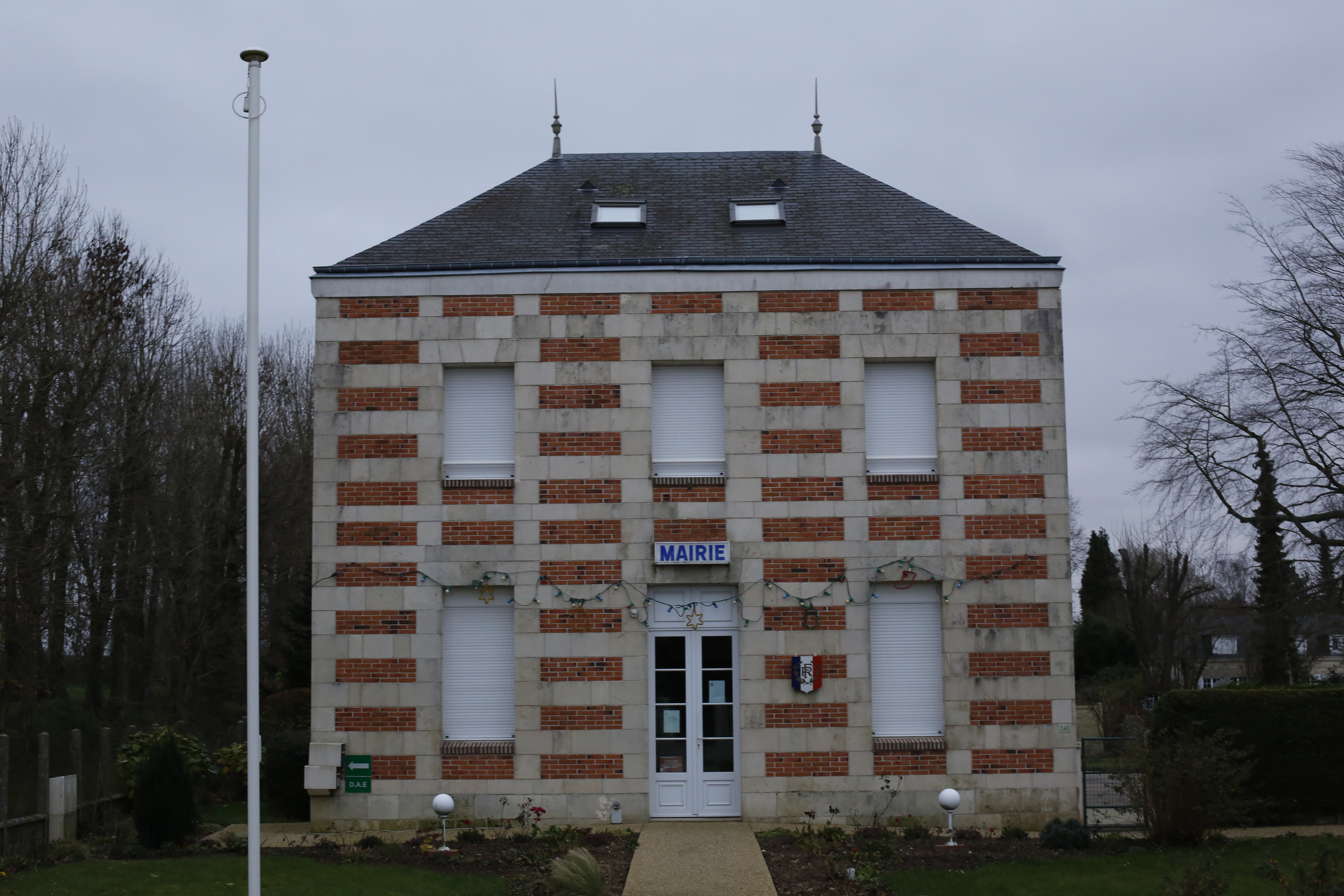
The town hall.

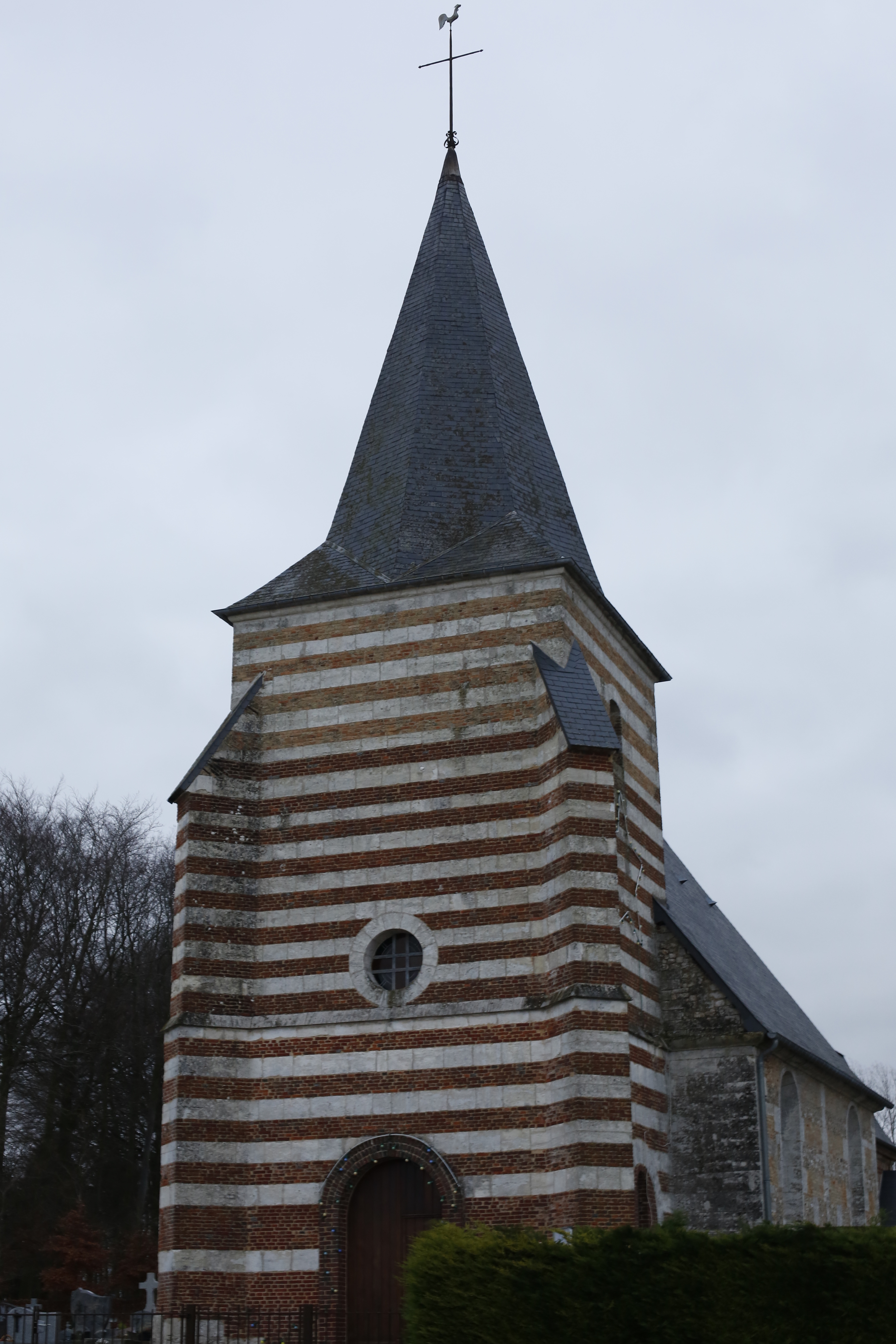
Saint Pierre Church.

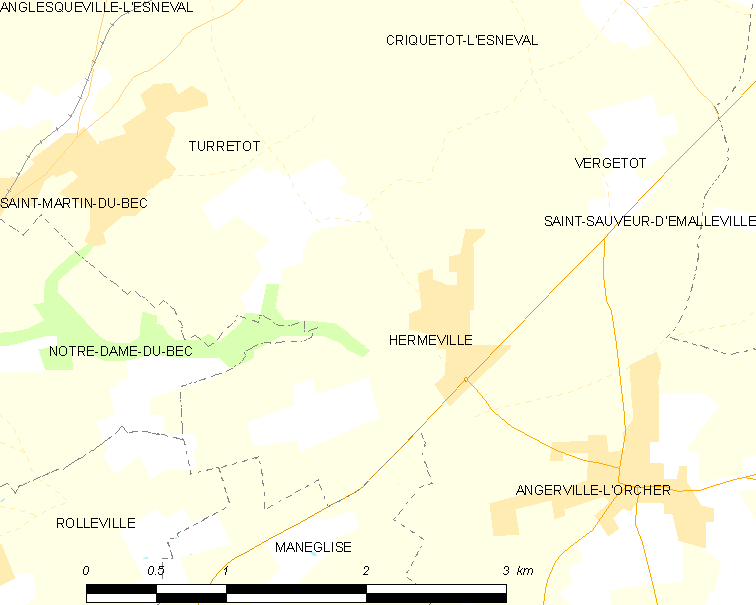

- The chapel of St.Pierre, dating from the seventeenth century.
- The sixteenth-century stone cross in the cemetery.

== See also ==
- Communes of the Seine-Maritime department
