= Mannevillette =

- Commune
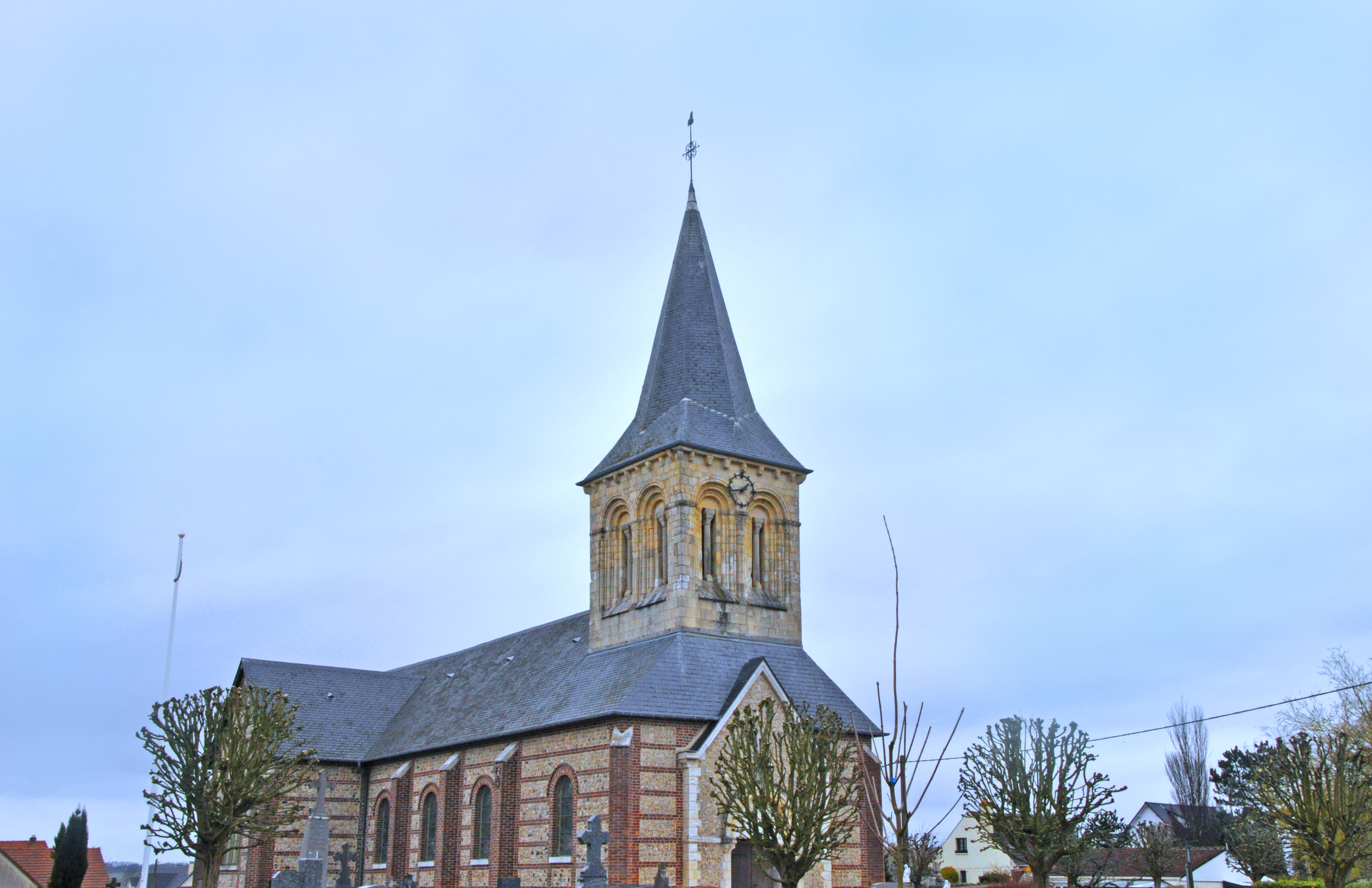
- The church in Mannevillette

- Coat of arms
- Location of Mannevillette
- Location within France Location within Normandy
- Coordinates: 49°35′51″N 0°10′33″E
- Country: France
- Region: Normandy
- Department: Seine-Maritime
- Arrondissement: Le Havre
- Canton: Octeville-sur-Mer
- Intercommunality: Le Havre Seine Métropole

Government
  - Mayor (2026–32): Patrick Fontaine
- Area^{1}: 4.21 km^{2} (1.63 sq mi)
- Elevation: 90 m (300 ft)
- Highest elevation: 106 m (348 ft)
- Lowest elevation: 62 m (203 ft)
- Population (2023): 935
  - Density: 222/km^{2} (575/sq mi)
- Time zone: UTC+01:00 (CET)
  - Summer (DST): UTC+02:00 (CEST)
- INSEE/Postal code: 76409 /76290
- ^{1} French Land Register data, which excludes lakes, ponds, glaciers > 1 km^{2} (0.386 sq mi or 247 acres) and river estuaries.

Mannevillette (French pronunciation: [manvilɛt]) is a commune in the Seine-Maritime department in the Normandy region in northern France.

== Geography ==
A farming village in the Pays de Caux situated some 8 miles (13 km) north of Le Havre, at the junction of the D111 and D79 roads.

== Heraldry ==
Arms of Mannevillette	The arms of Mannevillette are blazoned : Gules, in fess 3 stalks of wheat palewise, and on a chief azure 3 mullets (of 5) Or.

== Population ==
Historical population
Year	Pop.	±% p.a.
1968	324	—
1975	375	+2.11%
1982	385	+0.38%
1990	543	+4.39%
1999	690	+2.70%
2007	831	+2.35%
2012	809	−0.54%
2017	868	+1.42%
2023	935	+1.25%
Source: INSEE

== Places of interest ==
- The church of Notre-Dame, dating from the eleventh century.

== See also ==
- Communes of the Seine-Maritime department
