= Saint-Martin-du-Manoir =

- Commune
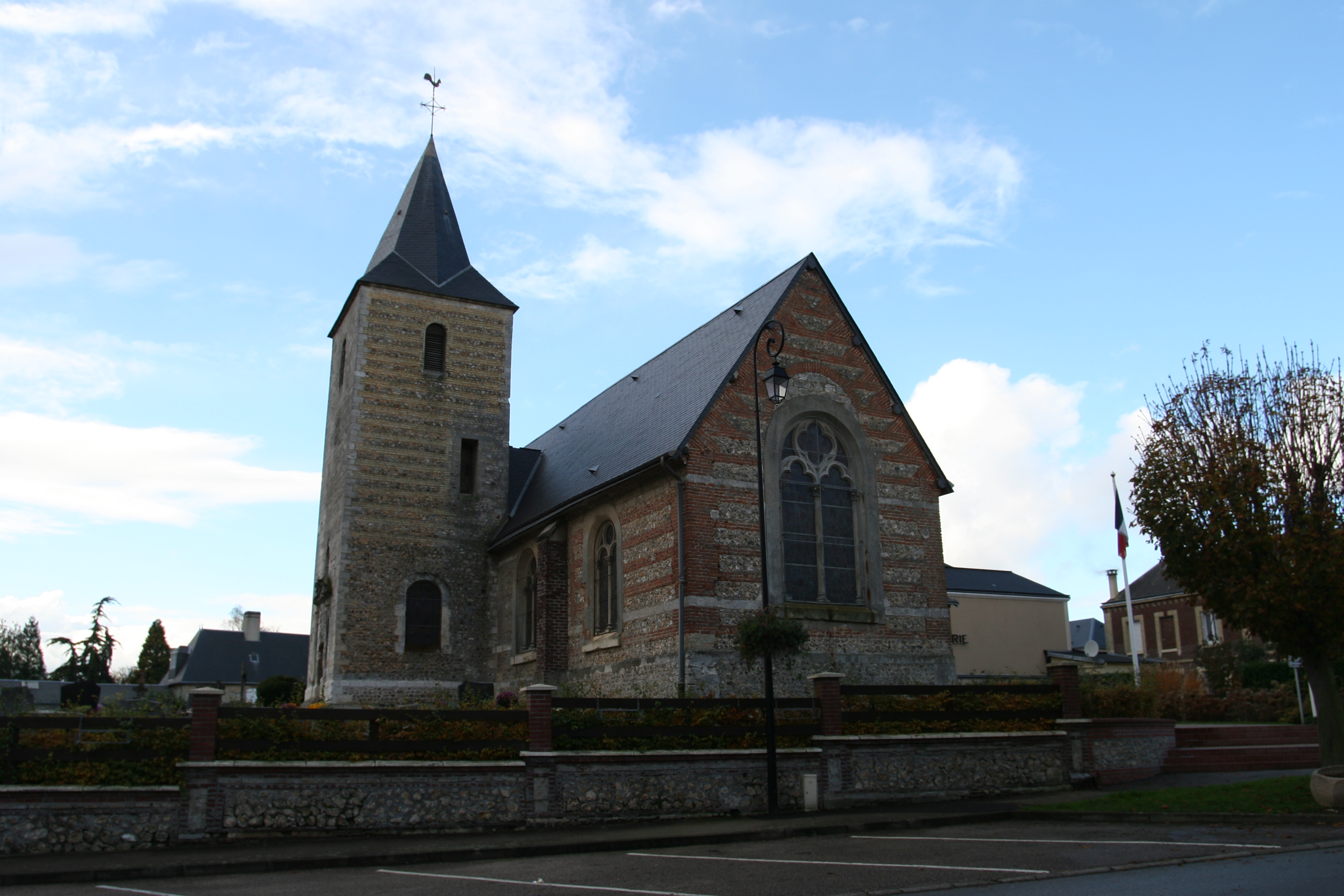
- The church

- Coat of arms
- Location of Saint-Martin-du-Manoir
- Location within France Location within Normandy
- Coordinates: 49°31′59″N 0°14′20″E
- Country: France
- Region: Normandy
- Department: Seine-Maritime
- Arrondissement: Le Havre
- Canton: Octeville-sur-Mer
- Intercommunality: Le Havre Seine Métropole

Government
  - Mayor (2026–32): Jean-Luc Fort
- Area^{1}: 5.13 km^{2} (1.98 sq mi)
- Elevation: 90 m (300 ft)
- Highest elevation: 102 m (335 ft)
- Lowest elevation: 12 m (39 ft)
- Population (2023): 1,555
  - Density: 303/km^{2} (785/sq mi)
- Time zone: UTC+01:00 (CET)
  - Summer (DST): UTC+02:00 (CEST)
- INSEE/Postal code: 76616 /76290
- ^{1} French Land Register data, which excludes lakes, ponds, glaciers > 1 km^{2} (0.386 sq mi or 247 acres) and river estuaries.

Saint-Martin-du-Manoir (French pronunciation: [sɛ̃ maʁtɛ̃ dy manwaʁ]) is a commune in the Seine-Maritime department in the Normandy region in northern France.

== Geography ==
A farming village in the Pays de Caux, situated some 7 miles (11 km) northeast of Le Havre, at the junction of the D34 and D111 roads, by the banks of the Saint-Laurent river.

== Heraldry ==
| Arms of Saint-Martin-du-Manoir | The arms of the commune of Saint-Martin-du-Manoir are blazoned : Per bend sinister azure and tenné, a bend sinister wavy argent between the sword of St. Martin fesswise holding up a cloak and an oak tree eradicated Or. |

== Population ==
Historical population
| Year | Pop. | ±% p.a. |
|---|---|---|
| 1968 | 606 | — |
| 1975 | 678 | +1.62% |
| 1982 | 1,715 | +14.18% |
| 1990 | 1,680 | −0.26% |
| 1999 | 1,542 | −0.95% |
| 2007 | 1,489 | −0.44% |
| 2012 | 1,544 | +0.73% |
| 2017 | 1,512 | −0.42% |
| 2023 | 1,555 | +0.47% |
Source: INSEE

== Places of interest ==
- The church of St. Martin, dating from the thirteenth century.
- The ruins of a sixteenth-century chateau.

== See also ==
- Communes of the Seine-Maritime department
