= Villainville =

- Commune
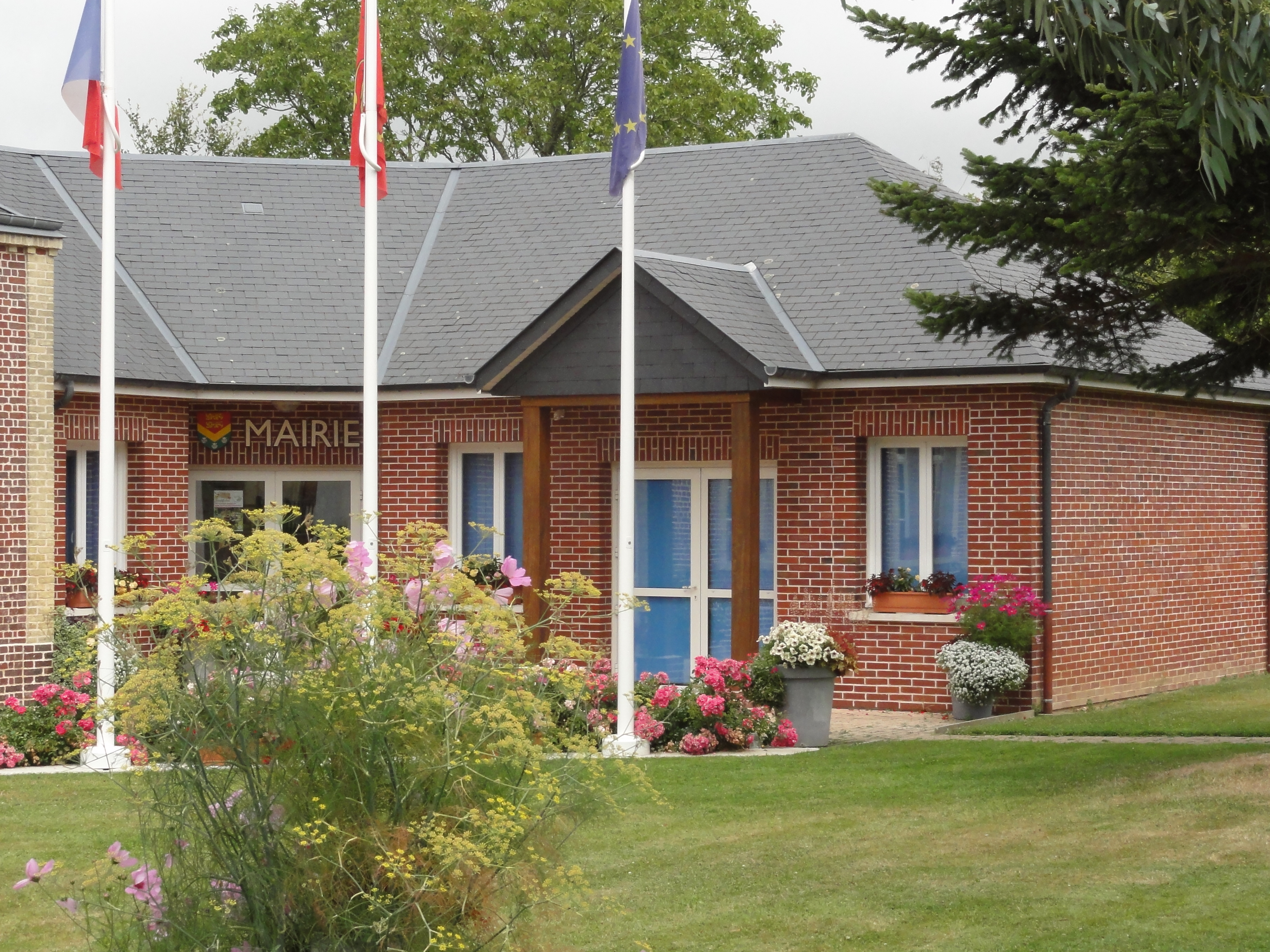
- Town hall

- Coat of arms
- Location of Villainville
- Location within France Location within Normandy
- Coordinates: 49°39′40″N 0°14′35″E
- Country: France
- Region: Normandy
- Department: Seine-Maritime
- Arrondissement: Le Havre
- Canton: Octeville-sur-Mer
- Intercommunality: Le Havre Seine Métropole

Government
  - Mayor (2023–2026): Karine Ramain
- Area^{1}: 3.65 km^{2} (1.41 sq mi)
- Elevation: 100 m (330 ft)
- Highest elevation: 129 m (423 ft)
- Lowest elevation: 27 m (89 ft)
- Population (2023): 313
  - Density: 85.8/km^{2} (222/sq mi)
- Time zone: UTC+01:00 (CET)
  - Summer (DST): UTC+02:00 (CEST)
- INSEE/Postal code: 76741 /76280
- ^{1} French Land Register data, which excludes lakes, ponds, glaciers > 1 km^{2} (0.386 sq mi or 247 acres) and river estuaries.

Villainville is a commune in the Seine-Maritime department in the Normandy region in northern France.

== Geography ==
A farming village in the Pays de Caux, situated some 14 miles (23 km) northeast of Le Havre, at the junction of the D139 and D74 roads.

== Population ==
Historical population
Year	Pop.	±% p.a.
1968	150	—
1975	165	+1.37%
1982	217	+3.99%
1990	239	+1.21%
1999	288	+2.09%
2007	293	+0.22%
2012	326	+2.16%
2017	294	−2.05%
2023	313	+1.05%
Source: INSEE

== Places of interest ==
- The church of St. Jacques, dating from the eleventh century.

== Twin towns ==
Newchurch, Isle of Wight, England

== See also ==
- Communes of the Seine-Maritime department
