= Fontaine-la-Mallet =

- Commune
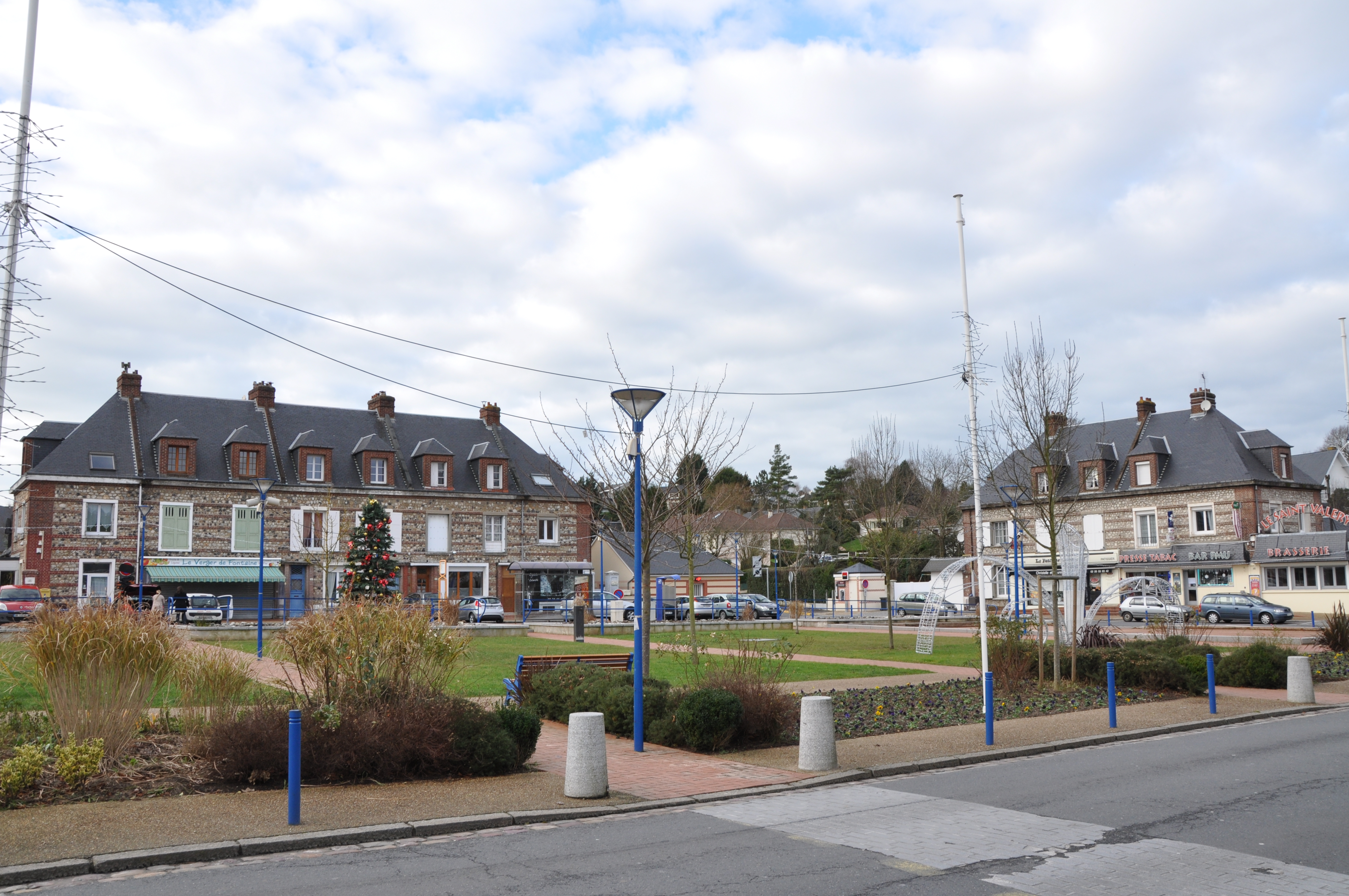
- Village square

- Coat of arms
- Location of Fontaine-la-Mallet
- Location within France Location within Normandy
- Coordinates: 49°32′14″N 0°08′44″E
- Country: France
- Region: Normandy
- Department: Seine-Maritime
- Arrondissement: Le Havre
- Canton: Octeville-sur-Mer
- Intercommunality: Le Havre Seine Métropole

Government
  - Mayor (2020–2026): Jean-Louis Maurice
- Area^{1}: 6.68 km^{2} (2.58 sq mi)
- Elevation: 27 m (89 ft)
- Highest elevation: 89 m (292 ft)
- Lowest elevation: 17 m (56 ft)
- Population (2023): 2,725
  - Density: 408/km^{2} (1,060/sq mi)
- Time zone: UTC+01:00 (CET)
  - Summer (DST): UTC+02:00 (CEST)
- INSEE/Postal code: 76270 /76290
- ^{1} French Land Register data, which excludes lakes, ponds, glaciers > 1 km^{2} (0.386 sq mi or 247 acres) and river estuaries.

Fontaine-le-Mallet (French pronunciation: [fɔ̃tɛn la malɛ]) is a commune in the Seine-Maritime department in the Normandy region in northern France.

== History ==
The first mention of the village dates from the eleventh century, when an abbess from Montivilliers bought 100 acres (0.40 km^{2}) of land in order to build a church here "in villa dicitur Fontenais ad opus ecclesiae Sancta Mariae". In a register of the Secretariat of the Archdiocese of Rouen, dating from 1479 to 1480, it mentions "Parochia Fontibus le Mallet" - Mallet coming from the name of the first seigneurs - the Malet de Graville family (c. 1200–1300). Fontaine-la-Mallet grew over the centuries and was all but destroyed by bombing in September 1944. It was the most badly affected village of the lower Seine. Rebuilding of the commune was started in the 1960s.

=== Heraldry ===
Arms of Fontaine-la-Mallet	The arms of Fontaine-la-Mallet are blazoned : Per bend Or and gules, on a bend wavy azure between 3 buckles gules and 2 leopards, at the base of the bend, stalks of wheat Or.

== Geography ==
A village of farming and forestry situated in the Pays de Caux, some 5 miles (8.0 km) north of Le Havre, near the junction of the D52 and the N328 roads.

== Population ==
Historical population
Year	Pop.	±% p.a.
1968	922	—
1975	1,503	+7.23%
1982	2,446	+7.20%
1990	2,482	+0.18%
1999	2,544	+0.27%
2007	2,712	+0.80%
2012	2,660	−0.39%
2017	2,626	−0.26%
2023	2,725	+0.62%
Source: INSEE

== See also ==
- Communes of the Seine-Maritime department
