= Vergetot =

- Commune
- Location of Vergetot
- Location within France Location within Normandy
- Coordinates: 49°37′09″N 0°16′48″E
- Country: France
- Region: Normandy
- Department: Seine-Maritime
- Arrondissement: Le Havre
- Canton: Octeville-sur-Mer
- Intercommunality: Le Havre Seine Métropole

Government
  - Mayor (2020–2026): Jean-Luc Hodierne
- Area^{1}: 4.31 km^{2} (1.66 sq mi)
- Elevation: 100 m (330 ft)
- Highest elevation: 134 m (440 ft)
- Lowest elevation: 96 m (315 ft)
- Population (2023): 435
  - Density: 101/km^{2} (261/sq mi)
- Time zone: UTC+01:00 (CET)
  - Summer (DST): UTC+02:00 (CEST)
- INSEE/Postal code: 76734 /76280
- ^{1} French Land Register data, which excludes lakes, ponds, glaciers > 1 km^{2} (0.386 sq mi or 247 acres) and river estuaries.

Vergetot (French pronunciation: [vɛʁʒəto]) is a commune in the Seine-Maritime department in the Normandy region in northern France.

== Geography ==
A farming village in the Pays de Caux, situated some 13 miles (21 km) northeast of Le Havre, at the junction of the D925 and D39 roads.

== Population ==
Historical population
Year	Pop.	±% p.a.
1968	177	—
1975	204	+2.05%
1982	180	−1.77%
1990	284	+5.87%
1999	349	+2.32%
2007	415	+2.19%
2012	430	+0.71%
2017	442	+0.55%
2023	435	−0.27%
Source: INSEE

== Places of interest ==
- The church of St. Pierre, dating from the seventeenth century.

== See also ==
- Communes of the Seine-Maritime department
