= Octeville-sur-Mer =

- Commune
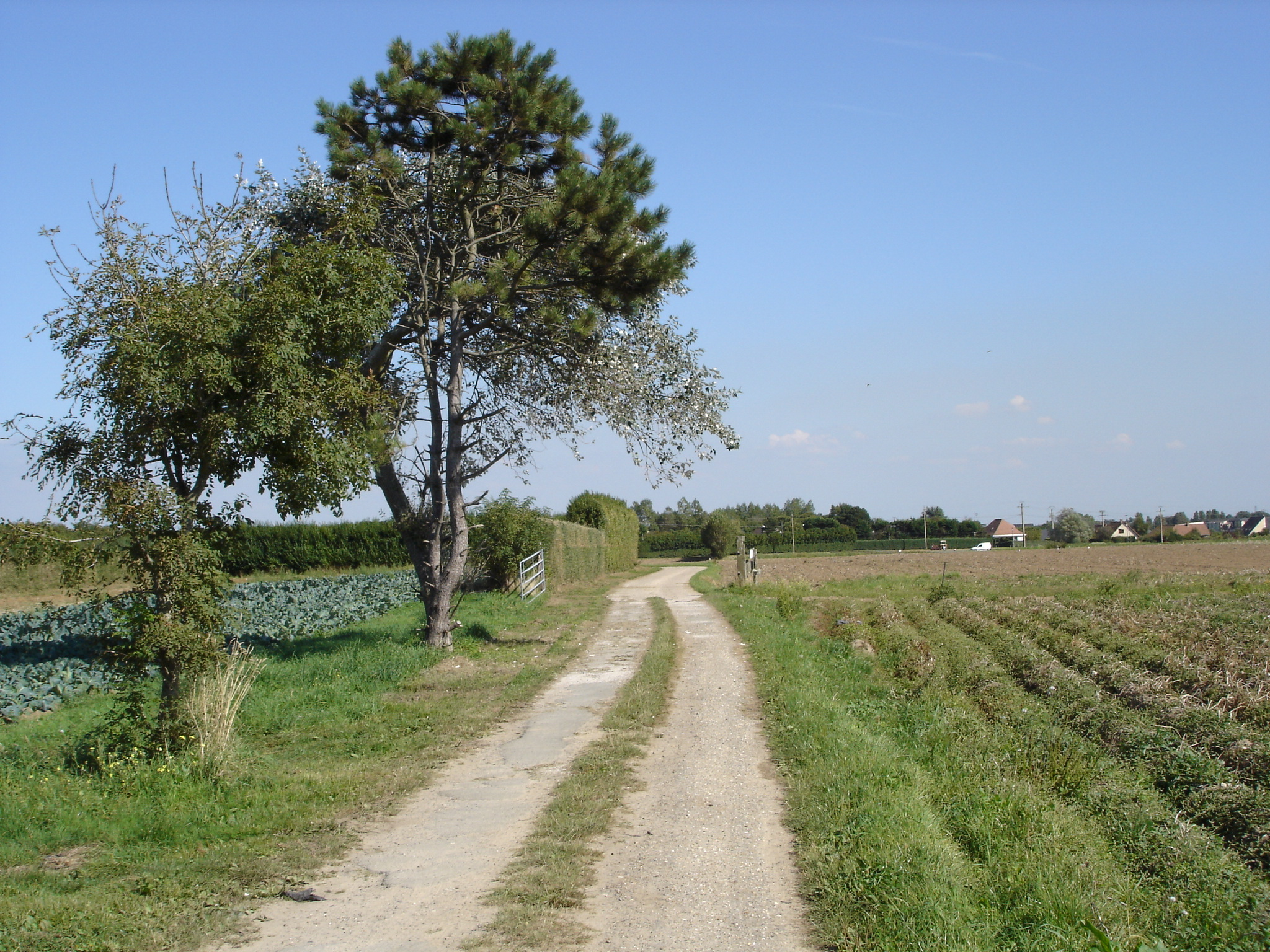
- The plateau between the village and the sea

- Coat of arms
- Location of Octeville-sur-Mer
- Location within France Location within Normandy
- Coordinates: 49°33′23″N 0°07′04″E
- Country: France
- Region: Normandy
- Department: Seine-Maritime
- Arrondissement: Le Havre
- Canton: Octeville-sur-Mer
- Intercommunality: Le Havre Seine Métropole

Government
  - Mayor (2026–32): Olivier Roche
- Area^{1}: 20.37 km^{2} (7.86 sq mi)
- Elevation: 75 m (246 ft)
- Highest elevation: 105 m (344 ft)
- Lowest elevation: 0 m (0 ft)
- Population (2023): 6,172
  - Density: 303.0/km^{2} (784.8/sq mi)
- Time zone: UTC+01:00 (CET)
  - Summer (DST): UTC+02:00 (CEST)
- INSEE/Postal code: 76481 /76930
- ^{1} French Land Register data, which excludes lakes, ponds, glaciers > 1 km^{2} (0.386 sq mi or 247 acres) and river estuaries.

Octeville-sur-Mer (French pronunciation: [ɔktəvil syʁ mɛʁ], literally Octeville on Sea) is a commune in the Seine-Maritime department, Normandy, northern France. It is twinned with Bourne End (Bucks) in United Kingdom since 2003 and with Furci Siculo (Sicily) in Italy since 2010.

== Geography ==
A small farming town in the Pays de Caux with huge cliffs overlooking the English Channel, some 4 miles (6.4 km) north of Le Havre, at the junction of the D31 and D940 roads. The commune covers a large area, and boasts an airport (of Le Havre), a golf course and several small villages and hamlets.

== Heraldry ==
Arms of Octeville-sur-Mer	The arms of Octeville-sur-Mer are blazoned : “D'azur au chevron brisé d'argent, accompagné de trois coquilles d'or.” (“Azure, a chevron burst argent between 3 escallops Or.”)

== Population ==
Historical population
Year	Pop.	±% p.a.
1968	2,057	—
1975	2,334	+1.82%
1982	3,251	+4.85%
1990	4,005	+2.64%
1999	4,834	+2.11%
2007	5,516	+1.66%
2012	5,794	+0.99%
2017	5,918	+0.42%
2023	6,172	+0.70%
Source: INSEE

== Places of interest ==
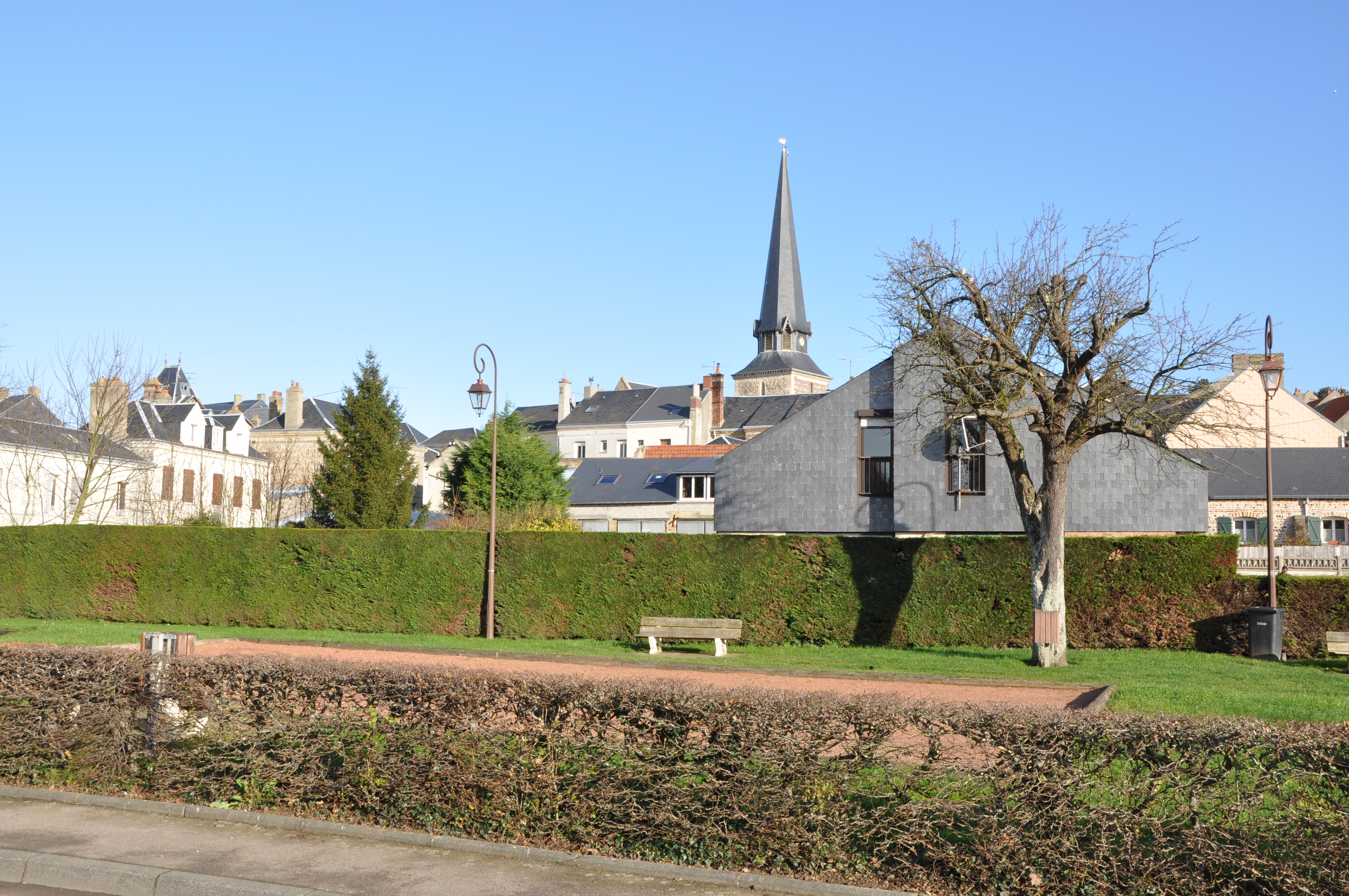
Center and church

- The church of St. Martin, dating from the thirteenth century.
- The church of St. Barthélemy, dating from the seventeenth century.
- The remains of some World War II artillery defences.

== See also ==
- Communes of the Seine-Maritime department
