= Angerville-l'Orcher =

- Commune
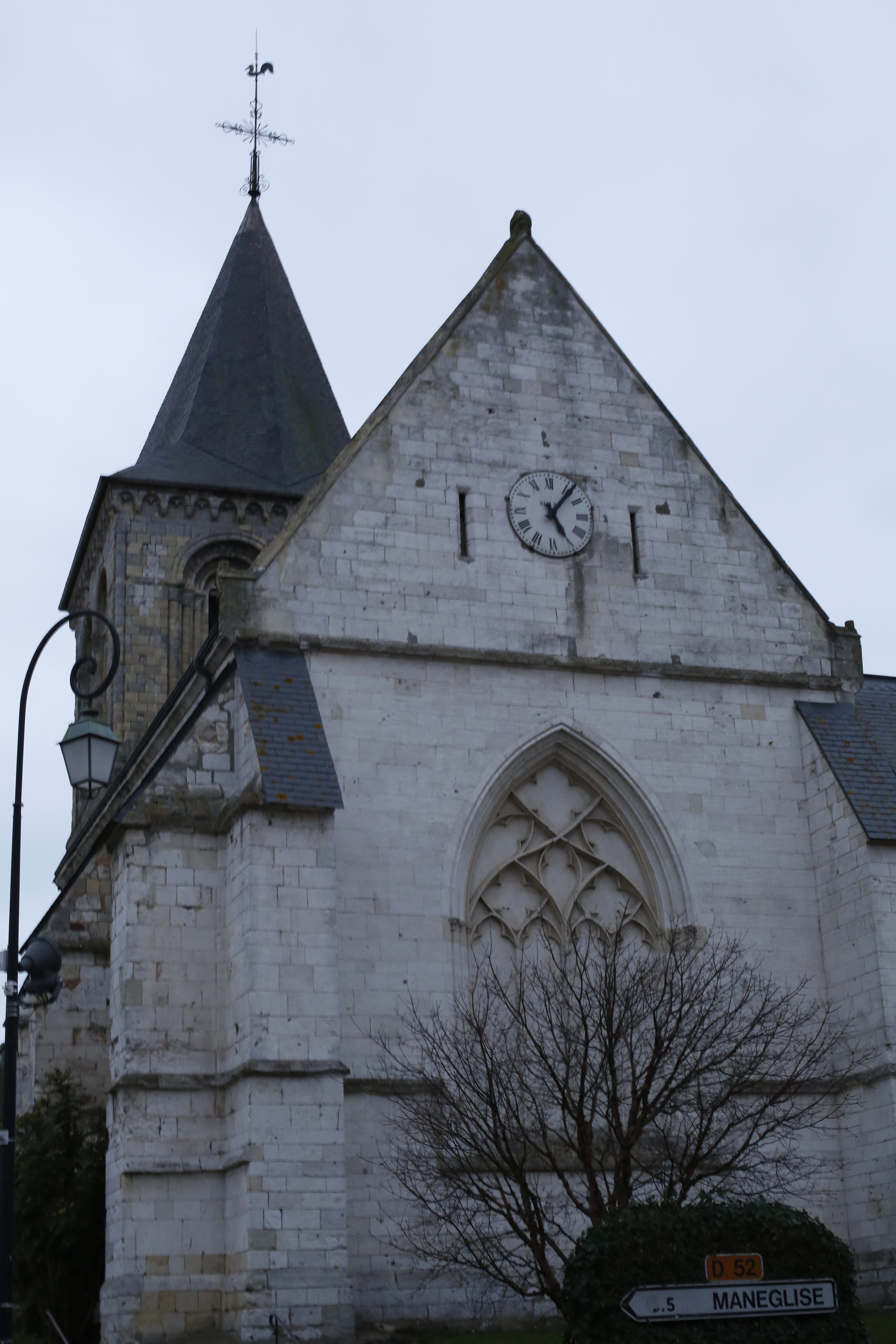
- The church in Angerville-l'Orcher

- Coat of arms
- Location of Angerville-l'Orcher
- Location within France Location within Normandy
- Coordinates: 49°35′15″N 0°16′52″E
- Country: France
- Region: Normandy
- Department: Seine-Maritime
- Arrondissement: Le Havre
- Canton: Octeville-sur-Mer
- Intercommunality: Le Havre Seine Métropole

Government
  - Mayor (2026–32): Frédéric Basille
- Area^{1}: 9.91 km^{2} (3.83 sq mi)
- Elevation: 110 m (360 ft)
- Highest elevation: 130 m (430 ft)
- Lowest elevation: 74 m (243 ft)
- Population (2023): 1,395
  - Density: 141/km^{2} (365/sq mi)
- Time zone: UTC+01:00 (CET)
  - Summer (DST): UTC+02:00 (CEST)
- INSEE/Postal code: 76014 /76280
- ^{1} French Land Register data, which excludes lakes, ponds, glaciers > 1 km^{2} (0.386 sq mi or 247 acres) and river estuaries.

Angerville-l'Orcher is a commune in the Seine-Maritime department in the Normandy region in northern France.

== Geography ==
A farming village situated in the Pays de Caux, some 9 miles (14 km) northeast of Le Havre, at the junction of the D39 and the D52.

== Heraldry ==
Arms of Angerville-l'Orcher	The arms of Angerville-l'Orcher are blazoned : Or, a leopard gules and a cinqfoil sable.

== Population ==
Historical population
Year	Pop.	±% p.a.
1968	735	—
1975	927	+3.37%
1982	1,059	+1.92%
1990	1,161	+1.16%
1999	1,222	+0.57%
2007	1,343	+1.19%
2012	1,463	+1.73%
2017	1,426	−0.51%
2023	1,395	−0.37%
Source: INSEE

== Places of interest ==
- The church of Notre-Dame, dating from the twelfth century

== See also ==
- Communes of the Seine-Maritime department
