= Le Tilleul, Seine-Maritime =

Le Tilleul
- Commune
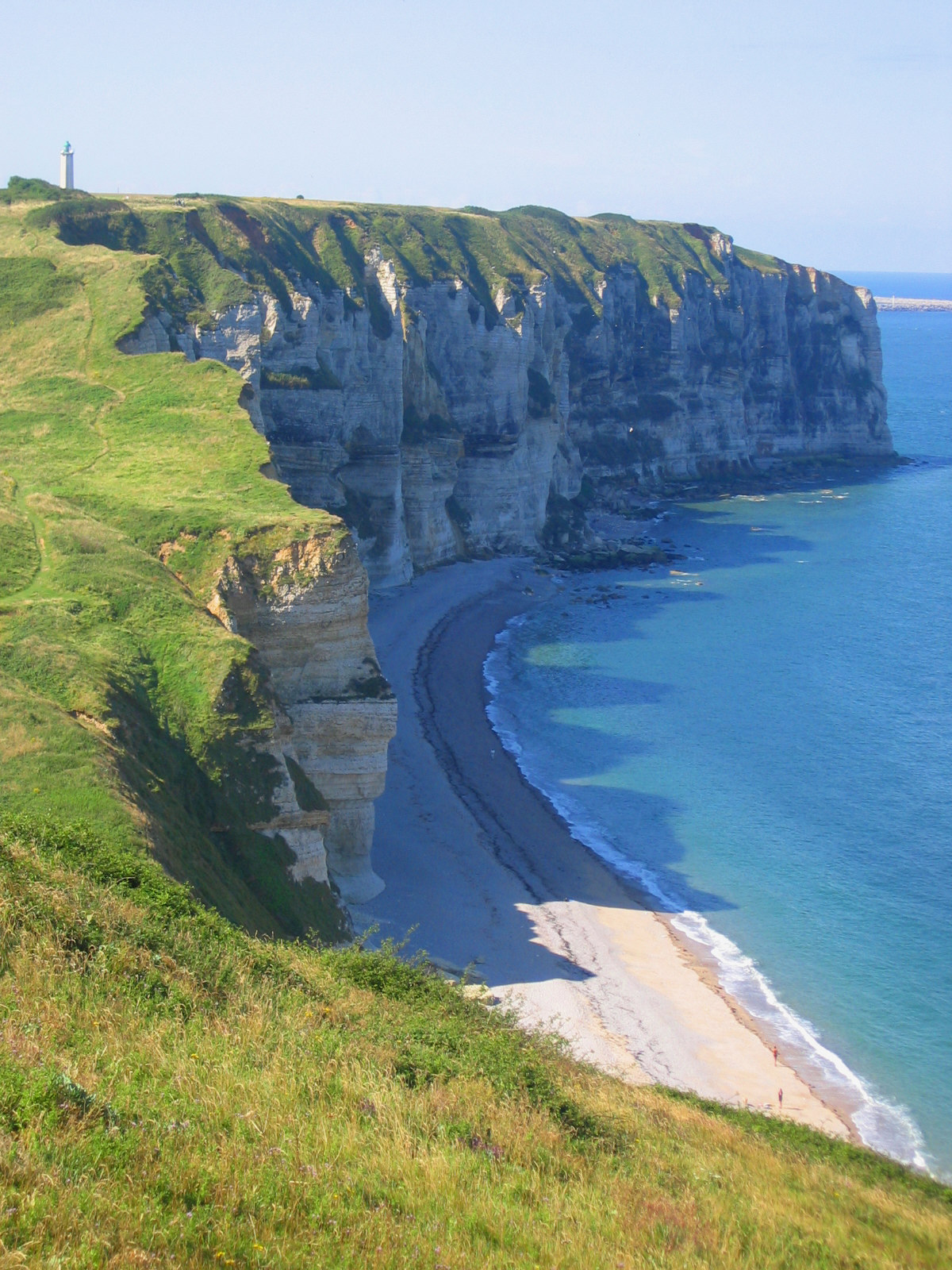
- The beach near Etretat

- Coat of arms
- Location of Le Tilleul
- Location within France Location within Normandy
- Coordinates: 49°40′59″N 0°12′23″E
- Country: France
- Region: Normandy
- Department: Seine-Maritime
- Arrondissement: Le Havre
- Canton: Octeville-sur-Mer
- Intercommunality: Le Havre Seine Métropole

Government
  - Mayor (2026–32): Raphaël Lesueur
- Area^{1}: 6.27 km^{2} (2.42 sq mi)
- Elevation: 110 m (360 ft)
- Highest elevation: 114 m (374 ft)
- Lowest elevation: 0 m (0 ft)
- Population (2023): 656
  - Density: 105/km^{2} (271/sq mi)
- Time zone: UTC+01:00 (CET)
  - Summer (DST): UTC+02:00 (CEST)
- INSEE/Postal code: 76693 /76790
- ^{1} French Land Register data, which excludes lakes, ponds, glaciers > 1 km^{2} (0.386 sq mi or 247 acres) and river estuaries.

Le Tilleul (French pronunciation: [lə tijœl]) is a commune in the Seine-Maritime department in the Normandy region in northern France.

== Geography ==
A farming village in the Pays de Caux, some 13 miles (21 km) northeast of Le Havre, at the junction of the D111 and D940.

== Heraldry ==
Arms of Le Tilleul	The arms of Le Tilleul are blazoned : Paly Or and azure, on a chief gules a linden flower slipped and leaved between 2 seagulls respectant Or. Canting arms ('Linden' is tilleul in French).

== Population ==
Historical population
Year	Pop.	±% p.a.
1968	518	—
1975	453	−1.90%
1982	525	+2.13%
1990	564	+0.90%
1999	582	+0.35%
2007	681	+1.98%
2012	699	+0.52%
2017	695	−0.11%
2023	656	−0.96%
Source: INSEE

== Places of interest ==
- The church of St. Martin, dating from the fifteenth century.
- The eighteenth-century chateau of Fréfossé.
- The cliffs and beach, which in 2007, provided the backdrop for some scenes in the film La Disparue de Deauville, starring Sophie Marceau.

== See also ==
- Communes of the Seine-Maritime department
