= Canton of Goderville =

Coordinates: 49°39′07″N 0°24′21″E

Goderville
- Former canton
- Interactive map of Goderville
- Country: France
- Region: Normandy
- Department: Seine-Maritime
- No. of communes: {{{nbcomm}}}
- Disbanded: 2015
- Area: 145.27 km^{2} (56.09 sq mi)
- Population (2012): 15,022
  - Density: 103.41/km^{2} (267.82/sq mi)

The Canton of Goderville is a former canton situated in the Seine-Maritime département and in the Haute-Normandie region of northern France. It was disbanded following the French canton reorganisation which came into effect in March 2015. It consisted of 22 communes, which joined the canton of Saint-Romain-de-Colbosc in 2015. It had a total of 15,022 inhabitants (2012).

== Geography ==
An area of farming and associated light industry in the arrondissement of Le Havre, centred on the small town of Goderville. The altitude varies from 32m (Bec-de-Mortagne) to 147m (Vattetot-sous-Beaumont) for an average altitude of 113m.

The canton comprised 22 communes:

- Angerville-Bailleul
- Annouville-Vilmesnil
- Auberville-la-Renault
- Bec-de-Mortagne
- Bénarville
- Bornambusc
- Bréauté
- Bretteville-du-Grand-Caux
- Daubeuf-Serville
- Écrainville
- Goderville
- Gonfreville-Caillot
- Grainville-Ymauville
- Houquetot
- Manneville-la-Goupil
- Mentheville
- Saint-Maclou-la-Brière
- Saint-Sauveur-d'Émalleville
- Sausseuzemare-en-Caux
- Tocqueville-les-Murs
- Vattetot-sous-Beaumont
- Virville

== Population ==
Historical population Canton of Goderville
| Year | 1962 | 1968 | 1975 | 1982 | 1990 | 1999 |
| Pop. | 8,218 | 8,948 | 8,900 | 10,646 | 11,733 | 12,488 |
| ±% | — | +8.9% | −0.5% | +19.6% | +10.2% | +6.4% |
From the year 1962 on: No double counting – residents of multiple communes (e.g. students and military personnel) are counted only once. Source: INSEE

== See also ==
- Arrondissements of the Seine-Maritime department
- Cantons of the Seine-Maritime department
- Communes of the Seine-Maritime department
