= Château de Bailleul (Seine-Maritime) =

Castle in France

Coordinates: 49°40′27″N 0°27′00″E

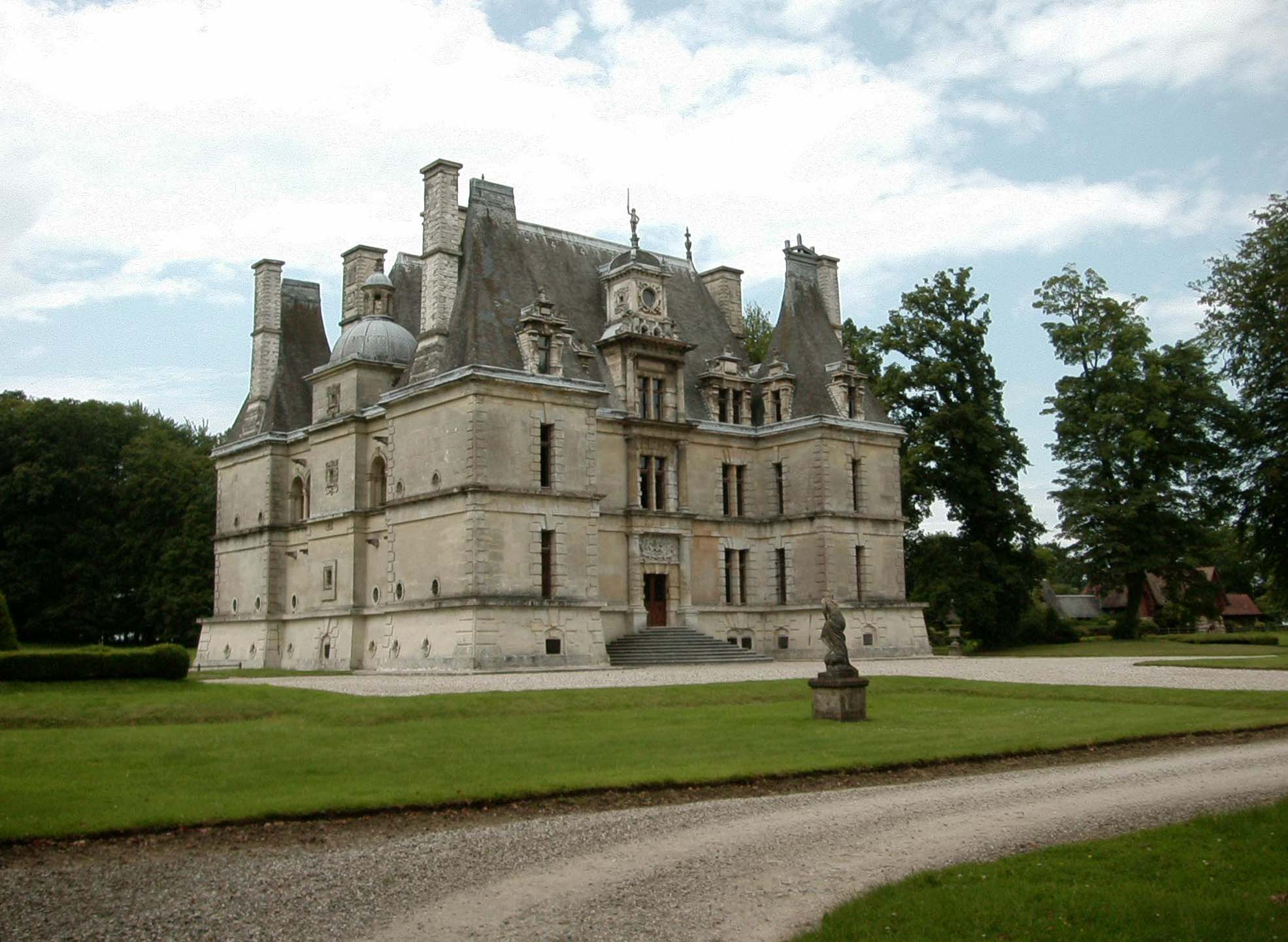
Château de Bailleul

Château de Bailleul is a mid-16th-century castle built in the Italian High Renaissance style, in Angerville-Bailleul, Seine-Maritime, France, by Bertrand de Bailleul.
