= Saint-Gilles-de-la-Neuville =

- Commune
- Location of Saint-Gilles-de-la-Neuville
- Location within France Location within Normandy
- Coordinates: 49°34′32″N 0°22′36″E
- Country: France
- Region: Normandy
- Department: Seine-Maritime
- Arrondissement: Le Havre
- Canton: Saint-Romain-de-Colbosc
- Intercommunality: Le Havre Seine Métropole

Government
  - Mayor (2026–32): Valérie Huon-Demare
- Area^{1}: 7.09 km^{2} (2.74 sq mi)
- Elevation: 109 m (358 ft)
- Highest elevation: 127 m (417 ft)
- Lowest elevation: 78 m (256 ft)
- Population (2023): 666
  - Density: 93.9/km^{2} (243/sq mi)
- Time zone: UTC+01:00 (CET)
  - Summer (DST): UTC+02:00 (CEST)
- INSEE/Postal code: 76586 /76430
- ^{1} French Land Register data, which excludes lakes, ponds, glaciers > 1 km^{2} (0.386 sq mi or 247 acres) and river estuaries.

Saint-Gilles-de-la-Neuville (French pronunciation: [sɛ̃ ʒil də la nøvil]) is a commune in the Seine-Maritime department in the Normandy region in northern France.

== Geography ==
It is a farming village in the Pays de Caux, situated 15 miles (24 km) northeast of Le Havre, at the junction of the D80 and D324 roads. The A29 autoroute passes through the south of the commune.

== Population ==
Historical population
Year	Pop.	±% p.a.
1968	386	—
1975	401	+0.55%
1982	445	+1.50%
1990	515	+1.84%
1999	562	+0.98%
2007	635	+1.54%
2012	663	+0.87%
2017	645	−0.55%
2023	666	+0.54%
Source: INSEE

== Places of interest ==
- A church dating from the twelfth century.

== See also ==
- Communes of the Seine-Maritime department
