= Communauté de communes Campagne de Caux =

Federation of municipalities in Normandy, France

Coordinates: 49.65°N 0.36°E

Campagne de Caux
- Communauté de communes
- Country: France
- Region: Normandy
- Department: Seine-Maritime
- No. of communes: {{{nbcomm}}}
- Established: 31 December 1997

Government
  - President: Franck Remond
- Area: 145.27 km^{2} (56.09 sq mi)
- Population (2018): 15,059
  - Density: 103.66/km^{2} (268.48/sq mi)
- Website: www.campagne-de-caux.fr

The communauté de communes Campagne de Caux is located in the Seine-Maritime département of the Normandy region of northern France. It was created on 31 December 1997. Its seat is Goderville. Its area is 145.3 km^{2}, and its population was 15,059 in 2018.

== Participants ==
The communauté de communes consists of the following 22 communes:

- Angerville-Bailleul
- Annouville-Vilmesnil
- Auberville-la-Renault
- Bec-de-Mortagne
- Bénarville
- Bornambusc
- Bréauté
- Bretteville-du-Grand-Caux
- Daubeuf-Serville
- Écrainville
- Goderville
- Gonfreville-Caillot
- Grainville-Ymauville
- Houquetot
- Manneville-la-Goupil
- Mentheville
- Saint-Maclou-la-Brière
- Saint-Sauveur-d'Émalleville
- Sausseuzemare-en-Caux
- Tocqueville-les-Murs
- Vattetot-sous-Beaumont
- Virville

== See also ==
- Communes of the Seine-Maritime department
