= Arrondissement of Le Havre =

Coordinates: 49°29′N 0°06′E

Le Havre
- Arrondissement
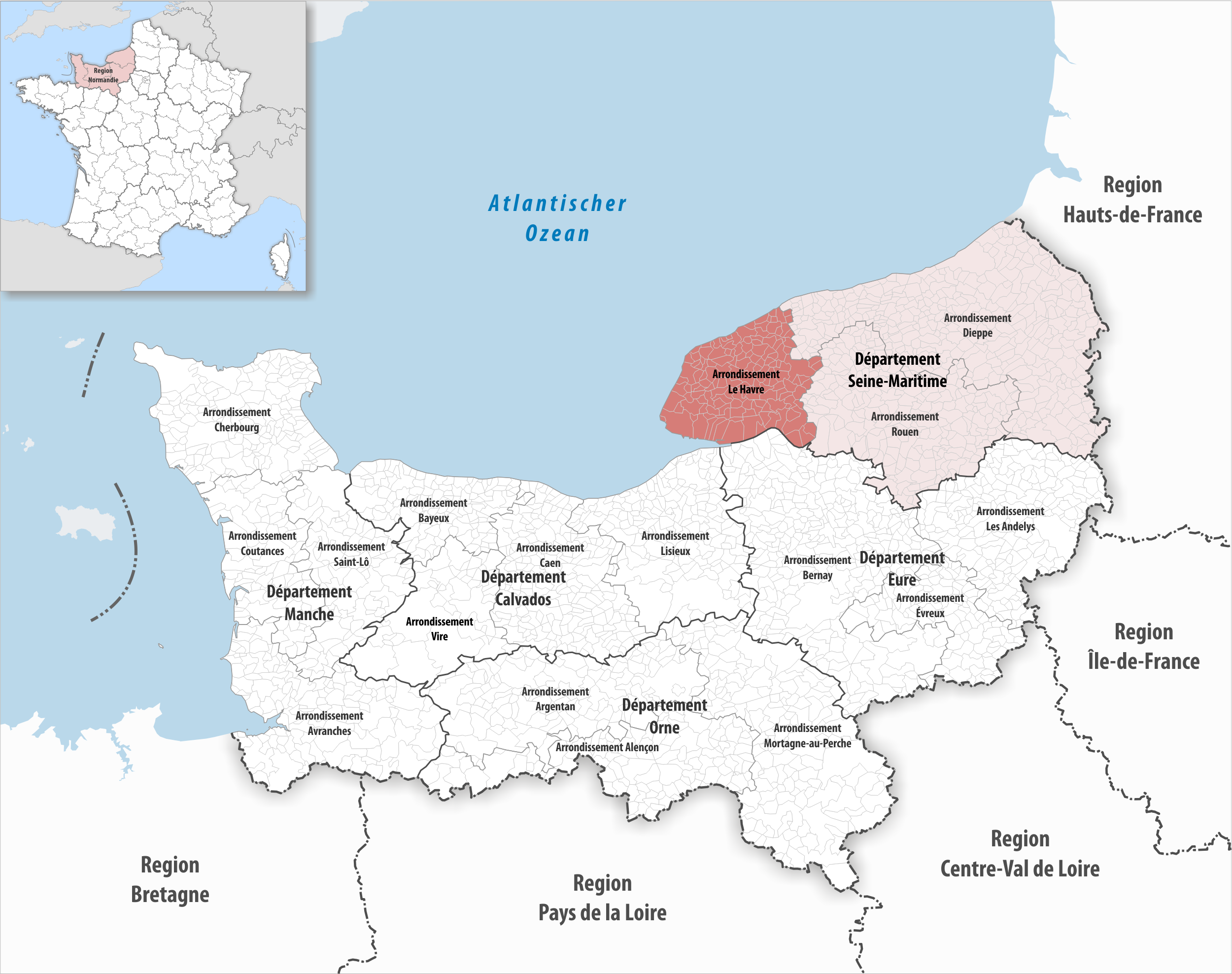
- Location within the region Normandy
- Country: France
- Region: Normandy
- Department: Seine-Maritime
- No. of communes: {{{nbcomm}}}
- Area: 1,221.2 km^{2} (471.5 sq mi)
- Population (2023): 384,491
  - Density: 314.85/km^{2} (815.45/sq mi)
- INSEE code: 762

The arrondissement of Le Havre is an arrondissement of France in the Seine-Maritime department in the Normandy region. It has 149 communes. Its population is 383,996 (2021), and its area is 1,221.2 km^{2} (471.5 sq mi).

== Composition ==
The communes of the arrondissement of Le Havre, and their INSEE codes, are:

1. Alvimare (76002)
2. Ancretteville-sur-Mer (76011)
3. Angerville-Bailleul (76012)
4. Angerville-la-Martel (76013)
5. Angerville-l'Orcher (76014)
6. Anglesqueville-l'Esneval (76017)
7. Annouville-Vilmesnil (76021)
8. Auberville-la-Renault (76033)
9. Beaurepaire (76064)
10. Bec-de-Mortagne (76068)
11. Bénarville (76076)
12. Bénouville (76079)
13. Bernières (76082)
14. Beuzeville-la-Grenier (76090)
15. Beuzevillette (76092)
16. Bolbec (76114)
17. Bolleville (76115)
18. Bordeaux-Saint-Clair (76117)
19. Bornambusc (76118)
20. Bréauté (76141)
21. Bretteville-du-Grand-Caux (76143)
22. Cauville-sur-Mer (76167)
23. La Cerlangue (76169)
24. Cléville (76181)
25. Cliponville (76182)
26. Colleville (76183)
27. Contremoulins (76187)
28. Criquebeuf-en-Caux (76194)
29. Criquetot-le-Mauconduit (76195)
30. Criquetot-l'Esneval (76196)
31. Cuverville (76206)
32. Daubeuf-Serville (76213)
33. Écrainville (76224)
34. Écretteville-sur-Mer (76226)
35. Életot (76232)
36. Envronville (76236)
37. Épouville (76238)
38. Épretot (76239)
39. Épreville (76240)
40. Étainhus (76250)
41. Étretat (76254)
42. Fécamp (76259)
43. Fongueusemare (76268)
44. Fontaine-la-Mallet (76270)
45. Fontenay (76275)
46. Foucart (76279)
47. La Frénaye (76281)
48. Froberville (76291)
49. Gainneville (76296)
50. Ganzeville (76298)
51. Gerponville (76299)
52. Gerville (76300)
53. Goderville (76302)
54. Gommerville (76303)
55. Gonfreville-Caillot (76304)
56. Gonfreville-l'Orcher (76305)
57. Gonneville-la-Mallet (76307)
58. Graimbouville (76314)
59. Grainville-Ymauville (76317)
60. Grand-Camp (76318)
61. Gruchet-le-Valasse (76329)
62. Harfleur (76341)
63. Hattenville (76342)
64. Le Havre (76351)
65. Hermeville (76357)
66. Heuqueville (76361)
67. Houquetot (76368)
68. Lanquetot (76382)
69. Lillebonne (76384)
70. Limpiville (76386)
71. Lintot (76388)
72. Les Loges (76390)
73. Manéglise (76404)
74. Maniquerville (76406)
75. Manneville-la-Goupil (76408)
76. Mannevillette (76409)
77. Mélamare (76421)
78. Mentheville (76425)
79. Mirville (76439)
80. Montivilliers (76447)
81. Nointot (76468)
82. Norville (76471)
83. Notre-Dame-du-Bec (76477)
84. Octeville-sur-Mer (76481)
85. Oudalle (76489)
86. Parc-d'Anxtot (76494)
87. Petiville (76499)
88. Pierrefiques (76501)
89. Port-Jérôme-sur-Seine (76476)
90. La Poterie-Cap-d'Antifer (76508)
91. Raffetot (76518)
92. La Remuée (76522)
93. Riville (76529)
94. Rogerville (76533)
95. Rolleville (76534)
96. Rouville (76543)
97. Sainneville (76551)
98. Saint-Antoine-la-Forêt (76556)
99. Saint-Aubin-Routot (76563)
100. Sainte-Adresse (76552)
101. Sainte-Hélène-Bondeville (76587)
102. Sainte-Marie-au-Bosc (76609)
103. Saint-Eustache-la-Forêt (76576)
104. Saint-Gilles-de-la-Neuville (76586)
105. Saint-Jean-de-Folleville (76592)
106. Saint-Jean-de-la-Neuville (76593)
107. Saint-Jouin-Bruneval (76595)
108. Saint-Laurent-de-Brèvedent (76596)
109. Saint-Léonard (76600)
110. Saint-Maclou-la-Brière (76603)
111. Saint-Martin-du-Bec (76615)
112. Saint-Martin-du-Manoir (76616)
113. Saint-Maurice-d'Ételan (76622)
114. Saint-Nicolas-de-la-Taille (76627)
115. Saint-Pierre-en-Port (76637)
116. Saint-Romain-de-Colbosc (76647)
117. Saint-Sauveur-d'Émalleville (76650)
118. Saint-Vigor-d'Ymonville (76657)
119. Saint-Vincent-Cramesnil (76658)
120. Sandouville (76660)
121. Sassetot-le-Mauconduit (76663)
122. Sausseuzemare-en-Caux (76669)
123. Senneville-sur-Fécamp (76670)
124. Sorquainville (76680)
125. Tancarville (76684)
126. Terres-de-Caux (76258)
127. Thérouldeville (76685)
128. Theuville-aux-Maillots (76686)
129. Thiergeville (76688)
130. Thiétreville (76689)
131. Le Tilleul (76693)
132. Tocqueville-les-Murs (76695)
133. Tourville-les-Ifs (76706)
134. Toussaint (76708)
135. Trémauville (76710)
136. La Trinité-du-Mont (76712)
137. Les Trois-Pierres (76714)
138. Trouville-Alliquerville (76715)
139. Turretot (76716)
140. Valmont (76719)
141. Vattetot-sous-Beaumont (76725)
142. Vattetot-sur-Mer (76726)
143. Vergetot (76734)
144. Villainville (76741)
145. Vinnemerville (76746)
146. Virville (76747)
147. Yébleron (76751)
148. Yport (76754)
149. Ypreville-Biville (76755)

== History ==
The arrondissement of Le Havre was created in 1800. At the January 2017 reorganisation of the arrondissements of Seine-Maritime, it lost 12 communes to the arrondissement of Dieppe and seven communes to the arrondissement of Rouen.

As a result of the reorganisation of the cantons of France which came into effect in 2015, the borders of the cantons are no longer related to the borders of the arrondissements. The cantons of the arrondissement of Le Havre were, as of January 2015:

1. Bolbec
2. Criquetot-l'Esneval
3. Fauville-en-Caux
4. Fécamp
5. Goderville
6. Gonfreville-l'Orcher
7. Le Havre-1
8. Le Havre-2
9. Le Havre-3
10. Le Havre-4
11. Le Havre-5
12. Le Havre-6
13. Le Havre-7
14. Le Havre-8
15. Le Havre-9
16. Lillebonne
17. Montivilliers
18. Ourville-en-Caux
19. Saint-Romain-de-Colbosc
20. Valmont

== Sub-prefects ==
- Richard Samuel: on 16 December 1999
