= Antoine-Vincent Arnault =

French playwright (1766–1834)

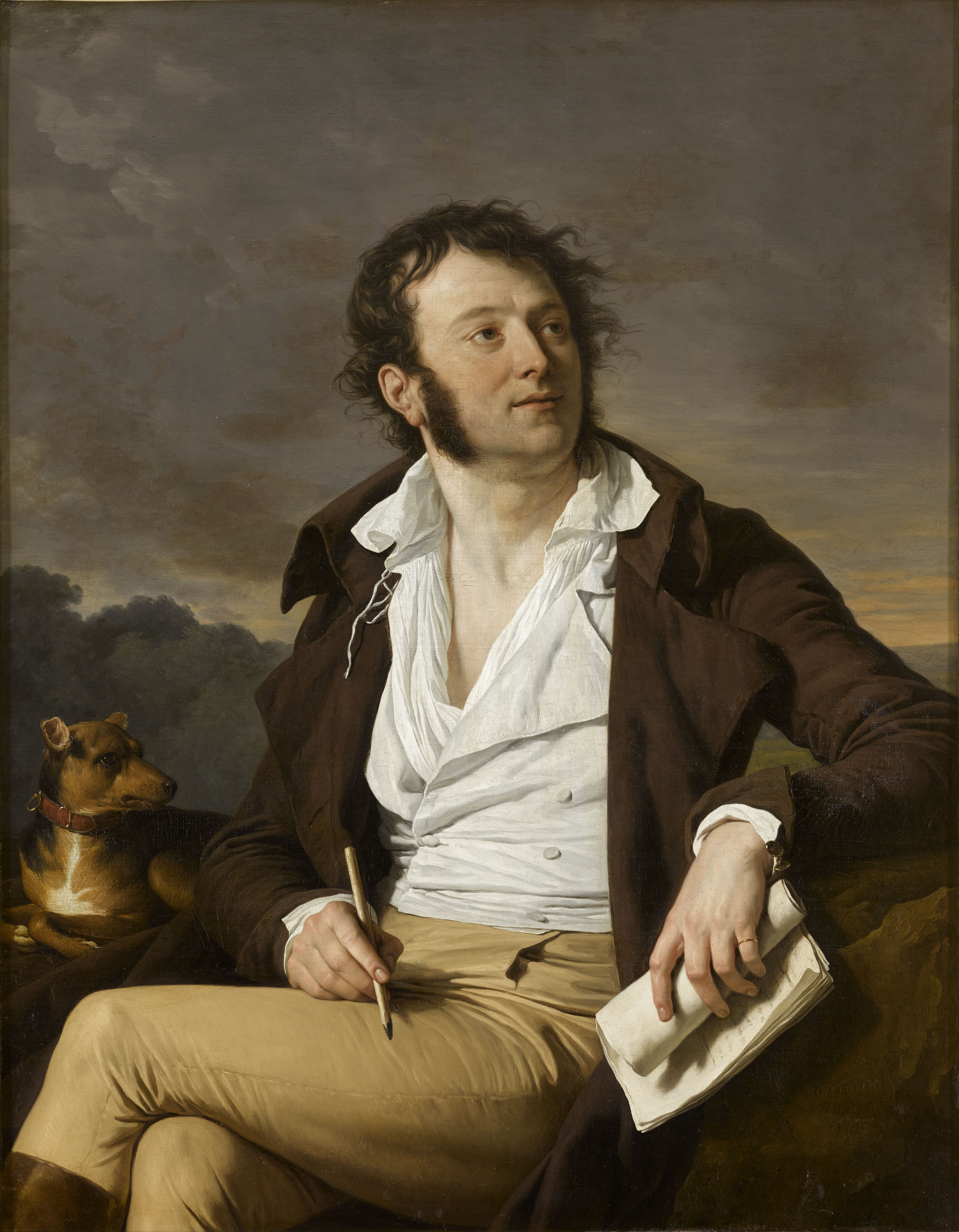
- Portrait by François-André Vincent, 1801
- Born: 1 January 1766; Paris, France
- Died: 16 September 1834 (aged 68); Goderville, France
- Occupation: Playwright

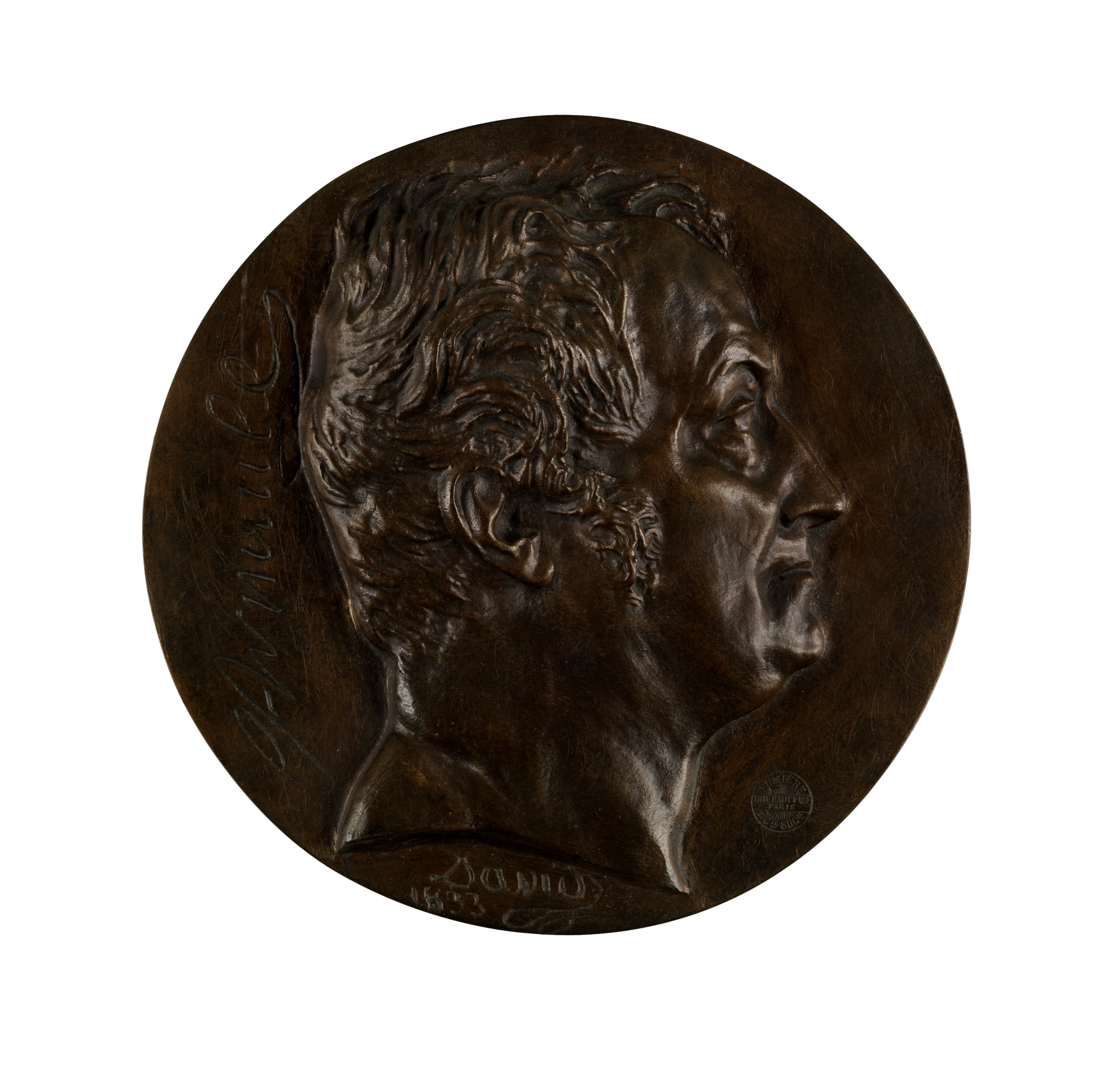
Medallion of Arnault by d'Angers

Antoine-Vincent, chevalier Arnault (1 January 1766 – 16 September 1834) was a French playwright.

== Life ==
Arnault was born in Paris. His first play, Marius à Minturne (1791), immediately established his reputation. A year later he followed with a second republican tragedy, Lucrèce. Arnault left France during the Reign of Terror, but on his return, he was arrested by the revolutionary authorities. He was freed through the intervention of Fabre d'Églantine and others. He was commissioned by Napoleon Bonaparte in 1797 with the organization of the French rule in the Ionian Islands, and was nominated to the Institute and made secretary general of the university. Elected to the Académie Française in 1803, he's excluded from it by ordinance in 1816, after the monarchy was restored, and reelected in 1829. Arnault was faithful to his patron through his misfortunes, and after the Hundred Days remained in exile until 1819. Arnault died at Goderville.

Other plays of Arnault's are: Blanche et Moncassin, ou les Vénitiens (1798); and Germanicus (1816), the performance of which was the occasion of a disturbance in the parterre which threatened serious political complications. His tragedies are now less well known than his Fables (1813, 1815 and 1826), which are written in graceful verse. Arnault collaborated a Vie politique et militaire de Napoléon 1er (1822), and wrote some very interesting Souvenirs d'un sexagénaire (4 vols, 1833), which contain much out-of-the-way information about the history of the years previous to 1804. Arnault's Œuvres complètes (4 vols.) were published at the Hague and Paris in 1818-9, and again (8 vols.) at Paris in 1824.

Arnault's eldest son, Emilien Lucien Arnault (1787–1863), wrote several tragedies, the leading rôles in which were interpreted by Talma.

== Works ==
Theatre

- 1787: Les Frayeurs d'Arlequin, one-act comedy
- 1787: Robinson Cruzoe dans son île, one-act comedy
- 1791: Marius à Minturnes, three-act tragedy, Paris, Théâtre-Français, 19 May
- 1792: Lucrèce, five-act tragedy, in verse, Paris, Comédiens français ordinaires du roi, 4 May Text online
- 1793: Mélidore et Phrosine, drame lyrique in 3 acts, Paris, théâtre lyrique de la rue Favart, 17 germinal an II
- 1794: Quintius Cincinnatus, r=three-act tragedy, Paris, théâtre de la République, 11 nivôse an III Text online
- 1794: Horatius Coclès, acte lyrique, Paris, théâtre national de l'Opéra, ler décadi 30 pluviôse l'an deuxième Text online
- 1795: Oscar, fils d'Ossian, five-act tragedy, Paris, théâtre de la République, 14 prairial an IV Text online
- 1798: Blanche et Montcassin, ou Les Vénitiens, tragedy in 5 acts, Paris, Théâtre-Français, 25 vendémiaire an VII Text online
- 1802: Don Pèdre ou Le roi et le laboureur, tragedy in five acts, in vers, Paris, Théâtre-Français
- 1804: Scipion consul, drame héroïque in i act and in verse
- 1813: Cadet-Roussel esturgeon, folie-parade in 2 acts, mingled with vaudevilles, with Marc-Antoine Désaugiers
- 1814: La Rançon de Duguesclin, ou Les Mœurs du XIVe
- 1817: Germanicus, tragedy in 5 acts and in verse, Paris, Comédiens français ordinaires du roi, 22 March
- 1817–19 Œuvres complètes. Théâtre (4 volumes)
- 1825: Guillaume de Nassau, tragedy in 5 acts
- 1827: Le Proscrit, ou Les Guelfes et les Gibelins, tragedy in 5 acts and in verse, dedicated to the prompter of the Comédie-Française, Paris, Théâtre-Français, 9 July

Trivia

- Fables (1802)
- Œuvres complètes de Jacques Delille (5 volumes, 1817–19)
- Biographie nouvelle des contemporains ou Dictionnaire historique et raisonné de tous les hommes qui, depuis la Révolution française, ont acquis de la célébrité par leurs actions, leurs écrits, leurs erreurs ou leurs crimes, soit en France, soit dans les pays étrangers; précédée d'un tableau par ordre chronologique des époques célèbres et des évènements remarquables, tant en France qu'à l'étranger, depuis 1787 jusqu'à ce jour, et d'une table alphabétique des assemblées législatives, à partir de l'assemblée constituante jusqu'aux dernières chambres des pairs et des députés (20 volumes en collaboration, 1820–25)

=== Biographie nouvelle des contemporains [1787-1820] ===
  - Arnault, Antoine-Vincent (1822). Biographie nouvelle des contemporains [1787-1820] (in French). Vol. 1. Paris: Librairie historique. OCLC 1528886. (A)
  - Arnault, Antoine-Vincent (1822). Biographie nouvelle des contemporains [1787-1820] (in French). Vol. 2. Paris: Librairie historique. OCLC 1528886. (B-Bez)
  - Arnault, Antoine-Vincent (1822). Biographie nouvelle des contemporains [1787-1820] (in French). Vol. 3. Paris: Librairie historique. OCLC 634112553. (Bi-By)
  - Arnault, Antoine-Vincent (1822). Biographie nouvelle des contemporains [1787-1820] (in French). Vol. 4. Paris: Librairie historique. OCLC 1528886. (Cab-Col)
  - Arnault, Antoine-Vincent (1822). Biographie nouvelle des contemporains [1787-1820] (in French). Vol. 5. Paris: Librairie historique. OCLC 1528886. (Coll-Dic)
  - Arnault, Antoine-Vincent (1822). Biographie nouvelle des contemporains [1787-1820] (in French). Vol. 6. Paris: Librairie historique. OCLC 1528886. (Did – Ez)
  - Arnault, Antoine-Vincent (1822). Biographie nouvelle des contemporains [1787-1820] (in French). Vol. 7. Paris: Librairie historique. OCLC 634112682. (F-Garra)
  - Arnault, Antoine-Vincent (1822). Biographie nouvelle des contemporains [1787-1820] (in French). Vol. 8. Paris: Librairie historique. OCLC 1528886. (Garra-Gyl)
  - Arnault, Antoine-Vincent (1823). Biographie nouvelle des contemporains [1787-1820] (in French). Vol. 9. Paris: Librairie historique. OCLC 1528886. (H-Jourdain)
  - Arnault, Antoine-Vincent (1823). Biographie nouvelle des contemporains [1787-1820] (in French). Vol. 10. Paris: Librairie historique. OCLC 634112764. (J-Lang)
  - Arnault, Antoine-Vincent (1823). Biographie nouvelle des contemporains [1787-1820] (in French). Vol. 11. Paris: Librairie historique. OCLC 1528886. (Lanne-Lenn)
  - Arnault, Antoine-Vincent (1823). Biographie nouvelle des contemporains [1787-1820] (in French). Vol. 12. Paris: Librairie historique. OCLC 634112834. (Lew-Marl)
  - Arnault, Antoine-Vincent (1822). Biographie nouvelle des contemporains [1787-1820] (in French). Vol. 13. Paris: Librairie historique. OCLC 1528886. (Marm-Monn)
  - Arnault, Antoine-Vincent (1822). Biographie nouvelle des contemporains [1787-1820] (in French). Vol. 14. Paris: Librairie historique. OCLC 1528886. (Mono-Nap)
  - Arnault, Antoine-Vincent (1827). Biographie nouvelle des contemporains [1787-1820] (in French). Vol. 15. Paris: Librairie historique. OCLC 634112972. (Napp-Pang)
  - Arnault, Antoine-Vincent (1827). Biographie nouvelle des contemporains [1787-1820] (in French). Vol. 16. Paris: Librairie historique. OCLC 1528886. (Pani-Pop)
  - Arnault, Antoine-Vincent (1827). Biographie nouvelle des contemporains [1787-1820] (in French). Vol. 17. Paris: Librairie historique. OCLC 1528886. (Por-Richel)
  - Arnault, Antoine-Vincent (1827). Biographie nouvelle des contemporains [1787-1820] (in French). Vol. 18. Paris: Librairie historique. OCLC 1528886. (Richep-San)
  - Arnault, Antoine-Vincent (1827). Biographie nouvelle des contemporains [1787-1820] (in French). Vol. 19. Paris: Librairie historique. OCLC 634113104. (San-Thou)
  - Arnault, Antoine-Vincent (1827). Biographie nouvelle des contemporains [1787-1820] (in French). Vol. 20. Paris: Librairie historique. OCLC 634113141. (Thu-Z)
- Vie politique et militaire de Napoléon (2 volumes, 1822–26)
- Œuvres (8 volumes, 1824–27)
- Œuvres. Philosophie (3 volumes, 1827)
- Souvenirs d'un sexagénaire (1833). Réédition : Champion, Paris, 2003.
- Fables nouvelles (1834) Texte en ligne
