= Virville =

- Commune
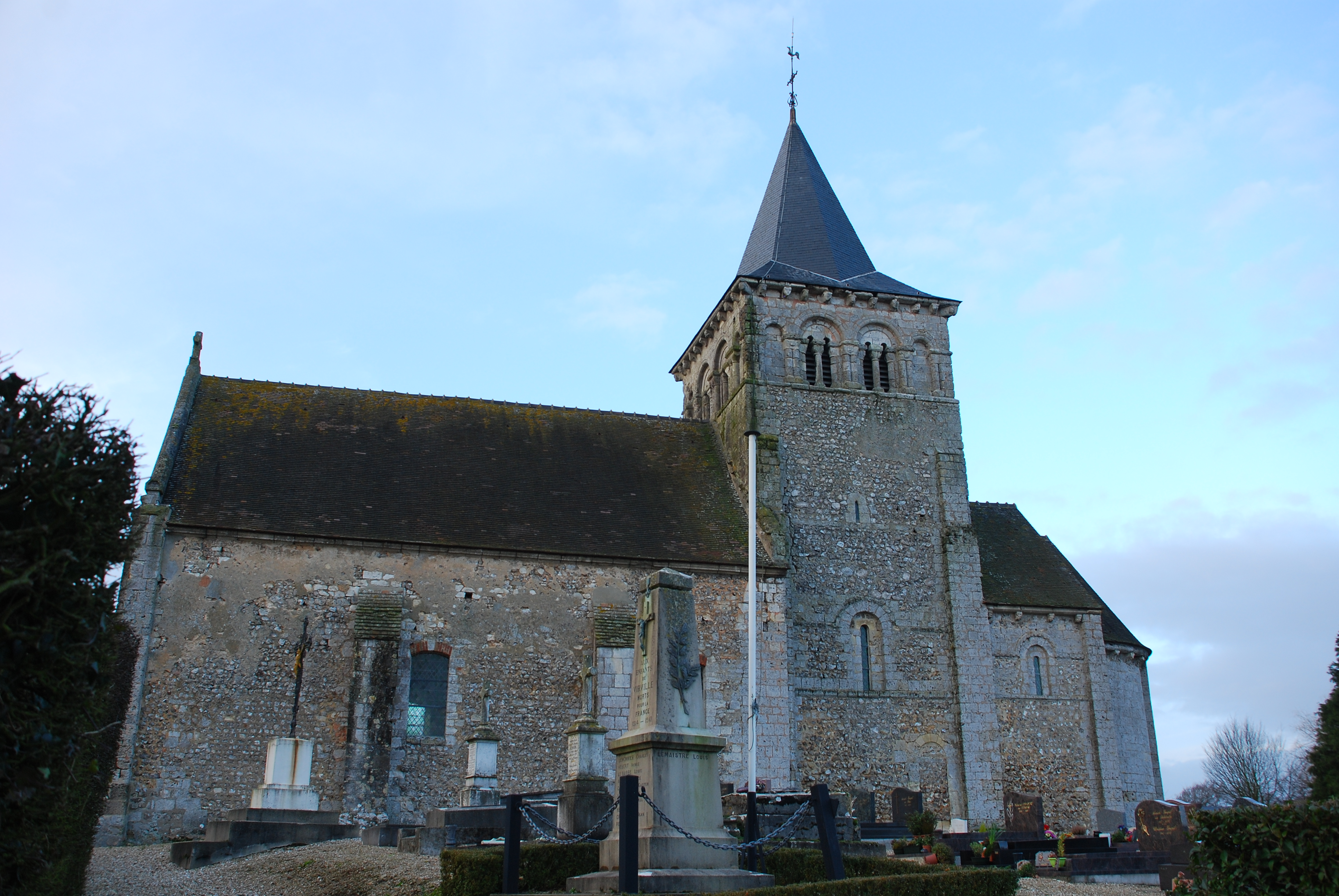
- The church in Virville
- Location of Virville
- Location within France Location within Normandy
- Coordinates: 49°35′33″N 0°21′21″E
- Country: France
- Region: Normandy
- Department: Seine-Maritime
- Arrondissement: Le Havre
- Canton: Saint-Romain-de-Colbosc
- Intercommunality: CC Campagne de Caux

Government
  - Mayor (2026–32): Emmanuelle Schuft
- Area^{1}: 2.46 km^{2} (0.95 sq mi)
- Elevation: 120 m (390 ft)
- Highest elevation: 127 m (417 ft)
- Lowest elevation: 93 m (305 ft)
- Population (2023): 340
  - Density: 140/km^{2} (360/sq mi)
- Time zone: UTC+01:00 (CET)
  - Summer (DST): UTC+02:00 (CEST)
- INSEE/Postal code: 76747 /76110
- ^{1} French Land Register data, which excludes lakes, ponds, glaciers > 1 km^{2} (0.386 sq mi or 247 acres) and river estuaries.

Virville (French pronunciation: [viʁvil]) is a commune in the Seine-Maritime department in the Normandy region in northern France.

== Geography ==
A small farming village in the Pays de Caux, situated some 13 miles (21 km) northeast of Le Havre, at the junction of the D125 and D10 roads. An SNCF TER railway station serves both this and a neighbouring commune.

== Population ==
Historical population
Year	Pop.	±% p.a.
1968	147	—
1975	155	+0.76%
1982	211	+4.50%
1990	254	+2.35%
1999	260	+0.26%
2007	303	+1.93%
2012	360	+3.51%
2017	357	−0.17%
2023	340	−0.81%
Source: INSEE

== Places of interest ==
- The church of St. Aubin, dating from the twelfth century.

== See also ==
- Communes of the Seine-Maritime department
