= Manneville-la-Goupil =

- Commune
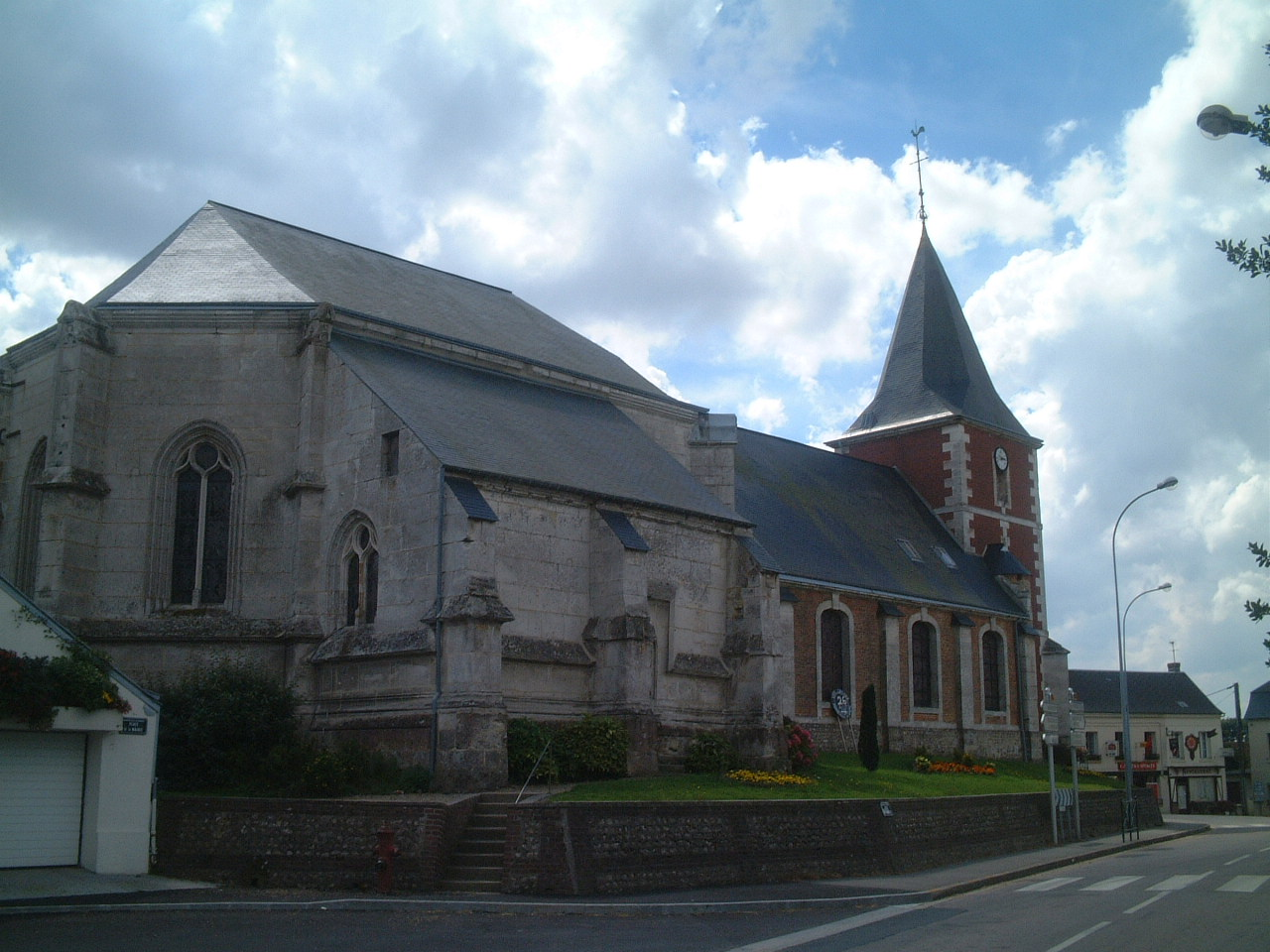
- The church in Manneville-la-Goupil

- Coat of arms
- Location of Manneville-la-Goupil
- Location within France Location within Normandy
- Coordinates: 49°36′40″N 0°21′14″E
- Country: France
- Region: Normandy
- Department: Seine-Maritime
- Arrondissement: Le Havre
- Canton: Saint-Romain-de-Colbosc
- Intercommunality: CC Campagne de Caux

Government
  - Mayor (2020–2026): Christian Solinas
- Area^{1}: 8.75 km^{2} (3.38 sq mi)
- Elevation: 140 m (460 ft)
- Highest elevation: 136 m (446 ft)
- Lowest elevation: 103 m (338 ft)
- Population (2023): 1,054
  - Density: 120/km^{2} (312/sq mi)
- Time zone: UTC+01:00 (CET)
  - Summer (DST): UTC+02:00 (CEST)
- INSEE/Postal code: 76408 /76110
- ^{1} French Land Register data, which excludes lakes, ponds, glaciers > 1 km^{2} (0.386 sq mi or 247 acres) and river estuaries.

Manneville-la-Goupil is a commune in the Seine-Maritime department in the Normandy region in northern France.

== Geography ==
A farming village in the Pays de Caux situated some 12 miles (19 km) northeast of Le Havre, at the junction of the D10 and D52 roads.

== Heraldry ==
Arms of Manneville-la-Goupil	The arms of Manneville-la-Goupil are blazoned : Or, a chevron azure between 2 fleurs-de-lys vert and a lion gules, on a chief azure a fox between 2 escallops argent.

== Population ==
Historical population
Year	Pop.	±% p.a.
1968	596	—
1975	583	−0.31%
1982	567	−0.40%
1990	809	+4.54%
1999	932	+1.59%
2007	981	+0.64%
2012	1,021	+0.80%
2017	1,021	+0.00%
2023	1,054	+0.53%
Source: INSEE

== Places of interest ==
- The church of Notre-Dame, dating from the eighteenth century.
- The château de Bourdemare.

== See also ==
- Communes of the Seine-Maritime department
