= Sausseuzemare-en-Caux =

- Commune
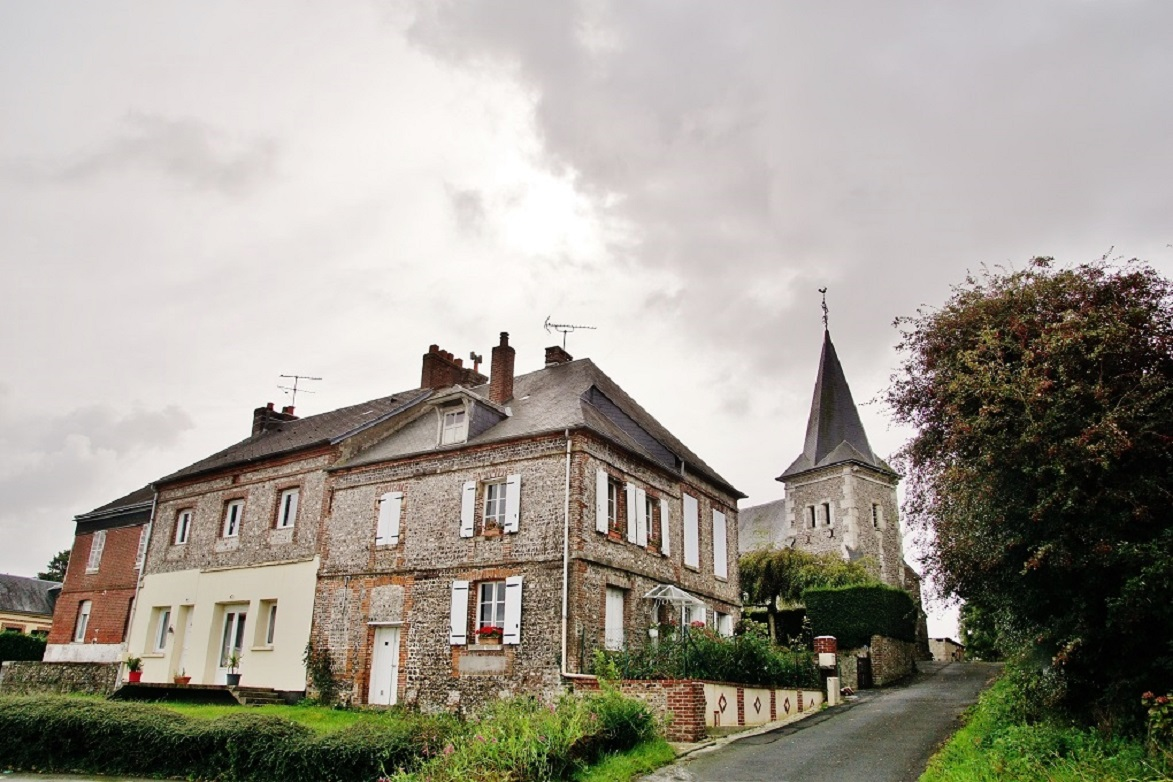
- A view within Sausseuzemare-en-Caux
- Location of Sausseuzemare-en-Caux
- Location within France Location within Normandy
- Coordinates: 49°40′00″N 0°20′37″E
- Country: France
- Region: Normandy
- Department: Seine-Maritime
- Arrondissement: Le Havre
- Canton: Saint-Romain-de-Colbosc
- Intercommunality: CC Campagne de Caux

Government
  - Mayor (2026–32): Anne-Sophie Basille
- Area^{1}: 3.88 km^{2} (1.50 sq mi)
- Elevation: 123 m (404 ft)
- Highest elevation: 137 m (449 ft)
- Lowest elevation: 86 m (282 ft)
- Population (2023): 425
  - Density: 110/km^{2} (284/sq mi)
- Time zone: UTC+01:00 (CET)
  - Summer (DST): UTC+02:00 (CEST)
- INSEE/Postal code: 76669 /76110
- ^{1} French Land Register data, which excludes lakes, ponds, glaciers > 1 km^{2} (0.386 sq mi or 247 acres) and river estuaries.

Sausseuzemare-en-Caux (French pronunciation: [sosøzmaʁ ɑ̃ ko], literally Sausseuzemare on Caux) is a commune in the Seine-Maritime department in the Normandy region in northern France.

== Geography ==
A farming village, by the coast of the English Channel, in the Pays de Caux, situated some 17 miles (27 km) northeast of Le Havre, at the junction of the D68 and D72 roads.

== Population ==
Historical population
Year	Pop.	±% p.a.
1968	248	—
1975	211	−2.28%
1982	283	+4.28%
1990	360	+3.05%
1999	360	+0.00%
2007	403	+1.42%
2012	414	+0.54%
2017	435	+0.99%
2023	425	−0.39%
Source: INSEE

== Places of interest ==
- The church of St. Etienne, dating from the seventeenth century.

== See also ==
- Communes of the Seine-Maritime department
