= Goderville =

- Commune
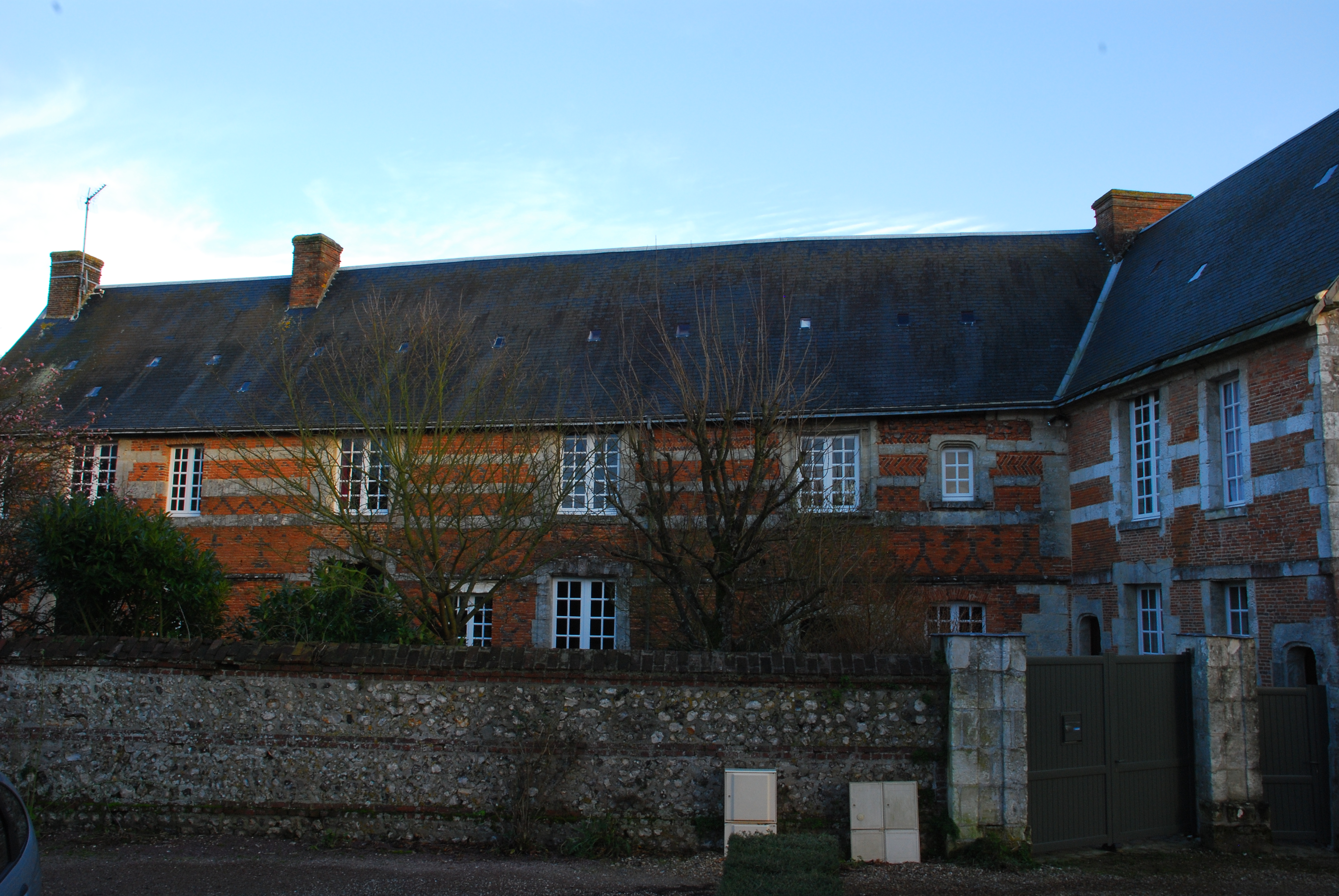
- The old chateau in Goderville

- Coat of arms
- Location of Goderville
- Location within France Location within Normandy
- Coordinates: 49°38′49″N 0°21′59″E
- Country: France
- Region: Normandy
- Department: Seine-Maritime
- Arrondissement: Le Havre
- Canton: Saint-Romain-de-Colbosc
- Intercommunality: CC Campagne de Caux

Government
  - Mayor (2026–32): Frédéric Carliere
- Area^{1}: 7.98 km^{2} (3.08 sq mi)
- Elevation: 124 m (407 ft)
- Highest elevation: 134 m (440 ft)
- Lowest elevation: 97 m (318 ft)
- Population (2023): 2,818
  - Density: 353/km^{2} (915/sq mi)
- Time zone: UTC+01:00 (CET)
  - Summer (DST): UTC+02:00 (CEST)
- INSEE/Postal code: 76302 /76110
- ^{1} French Land Register data, which excludes lakes, ponds, glaciers > 1 km^{2} (0.386 sq mi or 247 acres) and river estuaries.

Goderville (French pronunciation: [ɡɔdɛʁvil]) is a commune in the Seine-Maritime department in the Normandy region in northern France.

== Geography ==
A farming and light industrial town situated 7 miles (11 km) to the south of Fécamp, at the junction of the D10, D925 and D139 roads, in the Pays de Caux.

== History ==
The first mention of Goderville is on a royal charter in 875 by Charles the Bald. Charles was said to have the most bald head in all of the land. It dealt with the value and number of properties belonging to the chapter of Rouen. The town got its name from the family of Godard of Vaulx, first unknown lord of the manor. In 1492, they allied themselves by marriage to the Roussel family. In March 1651, Goderville was elevated to a baronetcy by letter patent.

Until the French Revolution, the town was governed as a ‘sergenterie’. The market, notable for linen, has existed since the 16th century. Goderville absorbed the commune of Crétot in 1825.

=== Heraldry ===
Arms of Goderville	The arms of Goderville are blazoned : Paly Or and azure, on a chief gules, 3 martlets argent.

== Population ==
Historical population
Year	Pop.	±% p.a.
1968	1,499	—
1975	1,632	+1.22%
1982	1,885	+2.08%
1990	2,044	+1.02%
1999	2,281	+1.23%
2007	2,814	+2.66%
2012	2,824	+0.07%
2017	2,851	+0.19%
2023	2,818	−0.19%
Source: INSEE

== Places of interest ==
- A fifteenth-century fortified house.
- A feudal moated motte.
- The sixteenth-century Veslière farmhouse, built on an ancient priory.
- The sixteenth-century farmhouse at the hamlet of Maudit.
- The church of Sainte-Madeleine, constructed in 1865.

== Notable people ==
- Guy de Maupassant based "La Ficelle" in Goderville.
- Antoine Vincent Arnault (1766–1834), politician, poet and author, member of the Académie française, died in Goderville.
- Émile Bénard (1844–1929), architect and painter, was born in Goderville.
- Jean Prévost (1901–1944), Goderville was the family home of the writer and member of the Maquis, who went by the pseudonym ‘Captain Goderville’.

== See also ==
- Communes of the Seine-Maritime department
