= Gonfreville-Caillot =

- Commune
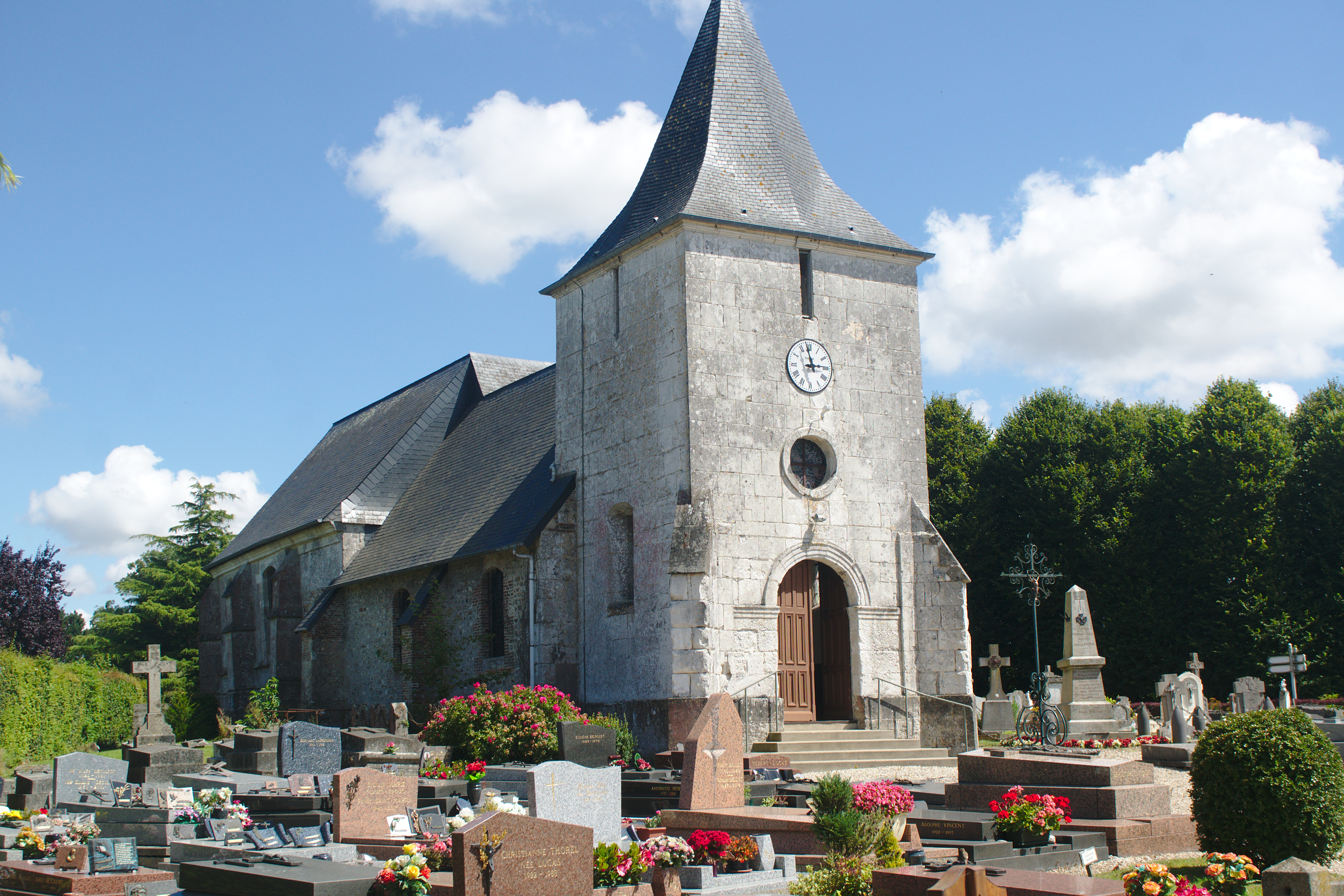
- The church in Gonfreville-Caillot

- Coat of arms
- Location of Gonfreville-Caillot
- Location within France Location within Normandy
- Coordinates: 49°39′10″N 0°26′29″E
- Country: France
- Region: Normandy
- Department: Seine-Maritime
- Arrondissement: Le Havre
- Canton: Saint-Romain-de-Colbosc
- Intercommunality: CC Campagne de Caux

Government
  - Mayor (2020–2026): Christian Leroux
- Area^{1}: 4.22 km^{2} (1.63 sq mi)
- Elevation: 129 m (423 ft)
- Highest elevation: 134 m (440 ft)
- Lowest elevation: 112 m (367 ft)
- Population (2023): 404
  - Density: 95.7/km^{2} (248/sq mi)
- Time zone: UTC+01:00 (CET)
  - Summer (DST): UTC+02:00 (CEST)
- INSEE/Postal code: 76304 /76110
- ^{1} French Land Register data, which excludes lakes, ponds, glaciers > 1 km^{2} (0.386 sq mi or 247 acres) and river estuaries.

Gonfreville-Caillot (French pronunciation: [ɡɔ̃fʁəvil kajo]) is a commune in the Seine-Maritime department in the Normandy region in northern France.

== Geography ==
A small farming village situated in the Pays de Caux, some 19 miles (31 km) northeast of Le Havre, at the junction of the D452 and D75 roads.

== Heraldry ==
Arms of Gonfreville-Caillot	The arms of Gonfreville-Caillot are blazoned : Azure, a chevron between 2 quail respectant and a griffon's head erased Or.

== Population ==
Historical population
Year	Pop.	±% p.a.
1968	157	—
1975	124	−3.31%
1982	215	+8.18%
1990	251	+1.95%
1999	262	+0.48%
2007	313	+2.25%
2012	343	+1.85%
2017	359	+0.92%
2023	404	+1.99%
Source: INSEE

== Places of interest ==
- The church of St.Maur, dating from the seventeenth century.
- The remains of a feudal motte.

== See also ==
- Communes of the Seine-Maritime department
