= Écrainville =

- Commune
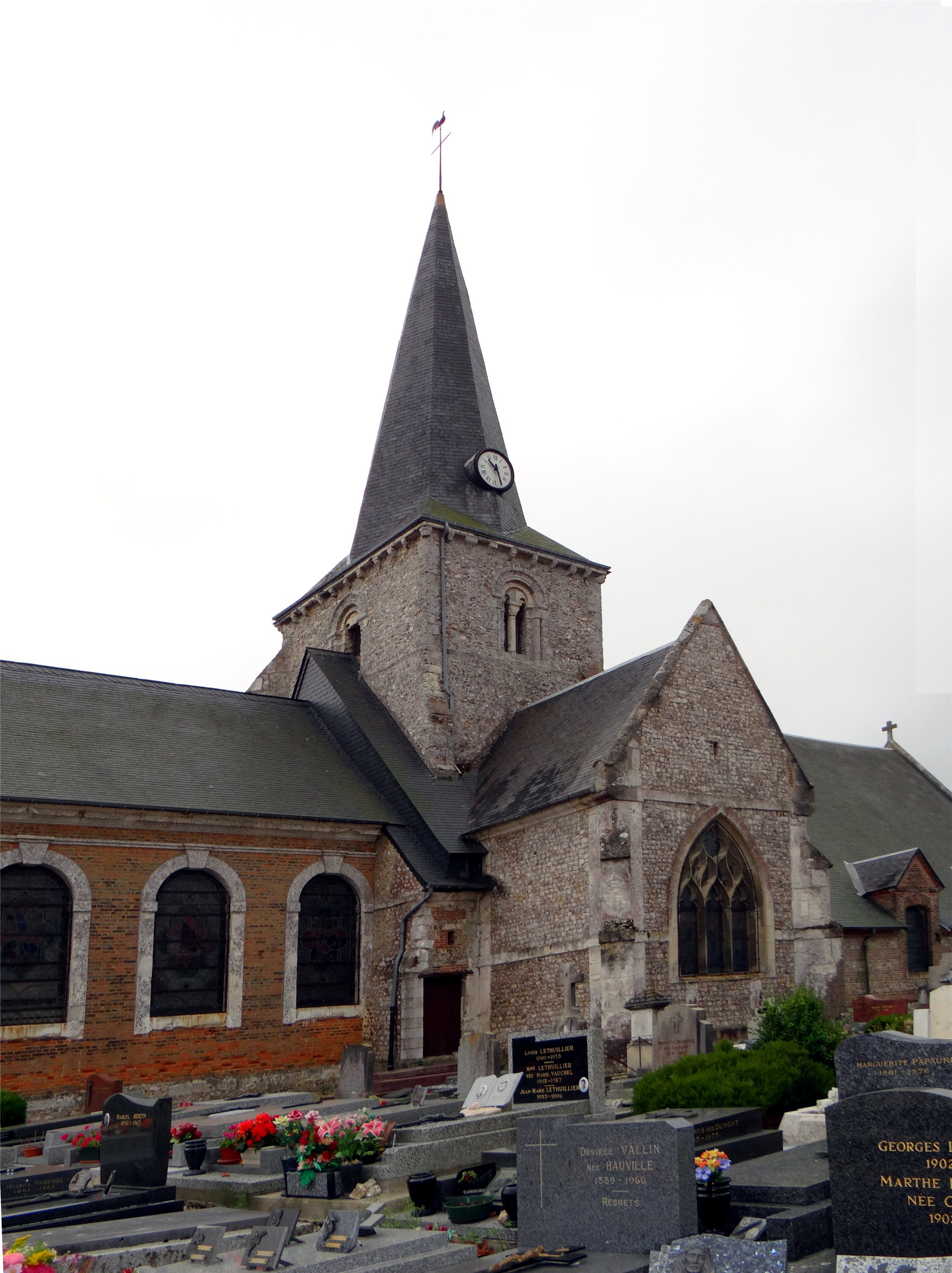
- The church in Écrainville
- Location of Écrainville
- Location within France Location within Normandy
- Coordinates: 49°39′09″N 0°19′17″E
- Country: France
- Region: Normandy
- Department: Seine-Maritime
- Arrondissement: Le Havre
- Canton: Saint-Romain-de-Colbosc
- Intercommunality: CC Campagne de Caux

Government
  - Mayor (2026–32): Claire Guéroult
- Area^{1}: 12.82 km^{2} (4.95 sq mi)
- Elevation: 110 m (360 ft)
- Highest elevation: 137 m (449 ft)
- Lowest elevation: 58 m (190 ft)
- Population (2023): 1,001
  - Density: 78.08/km^{2} (202.2/sq mi)
- Time zone: UTC+01:00 (CET)
  - Summer (DST): UTC+02:00 (CEST)
- INSEE/Postal code: 76224 /76110
- ^{1} French Land Register data, which excludes lakes, ponds, glaciers > 1 km^{2} (0.386 sq mi or 247 acres) and river estuaries.

Écrainville (French pronunciation: [ekʁɛ̃vil]) is a commune in the Seine-Maritime department in the Normandy region in northern France.

== Geography ==
A farming commune made up of 11 villages and hamlets in the Pays de Caux, situated some 13 miles (21 km) northeast of Le Havre, at the junction of the D68 and D139 roads.

== History ==
The origin of the name is uncertain, but Escrainvilla is first mentioned at the end of the 12th century. Many documents trace the occupation of the territory at the time of the Franks and even earlier. Abbé Dicquemare described, in 1778, the 150 human skeletons found in the crypt at the former quarry at Maucomble at Val-Miellé, and suggests that the crypt was prior to the 11th century, as the church of Saint-Denis dates from that period.
The first written mention of Écrainville or one of its hamlets dates back in the late 11th century. In 1180, the lord of Tennemare or Tannemare appeared in the records of the Exchequer of Normandy. Until the 17th century, the seigneurie passed from father to son of the Folville family.

A decree of 25 October 1826 joined Tennemare and Écrainville as one commune. In the 19th century the textile industry was still flourishing but declined from the 1920s onward.

== Population ==
Historical population
Year	Pop.	±% p.a.
1968	657	—
1975	683	+0.56%
1982	866	+3.45%
1990	919	+0.75%
1999	928	+0.11%
2007	1,013	+1.10%
2012	1,033	+0.39%
2017	1,022	−0.21%
2023	1,001	−0.35%
Source: INSEE

== Places of interest ==
- The church of St. Denis, dating from the eleventh century.
- A seventeenth century inn.
- The medieval manorhouse at Groseillers.
- The château d'Ecrainville.

== See also ==
- Communes of the Seine-Maritime department
