= Canton of Saint-Romain-de-Colbosc =

Coordinates: 49°31′45″N 0°20′45″E

Saint-Romain-de-Colbosc
- Canton
- Country: France
- Region: Normandy
- Department: Seine-Maritime
- No. of communes: {{{nbcomm}}}
- Area: 315.43 km^{2} (121.79 sq mi)
- Population (2023): 34,784
  - Density: 110.27/km^{2} (285.61/sq mi)
- INSEE code: 76 32

The Canton of Saint-Romain-de-Colbosc is a canton situated in the Seine-Maritime département and in the Normandy region of northern France.

== Geography ==
An area of farming and light industry in the arrondissement of Le Havre, centred on the town of Saint-Romain-de-Colbosc. The altitude varies from 0m (La Cerlangue) to 135m (La Remuée) with an average altitude of 107m.

== Composition ==
At the French canton reorganisation which came into effect in March 2015, the canton was expanded from 18 to 38 communes:

- Angerville-Bailleul
- Annouville-Vilmesnil
- Auberville-la-Renault
- Bec-de-Mortagne
- Bénarville
- Bornambusc
- Bréauté
- Bretteville-du-Grand-Caux
- La Cerlangue
- Daubeuf-Serville
- Écrainville
- Épretot
- Étainhus
- Goderville
- Gommerville
- Gonfreville-Caillot
- Graimbouville
- Grainville-Ymauville
- Houquetot
- Manneville-la-Goupil
- Mentheville
- Oudalle
- La Remuée
- Sainneville
- Saint-Aubin-Routot
- Saint-Gilles-de-la-Neuville
- Saint-Laurent-de-Brèvedent
- Saint-Maclou-la-Brière
- Saint-Romain-de-Colbosc
- Saint-Sauveur-d'Émalleville
- Saint-Vigor-d'Ymonville
- Saint-Vincent-Cramesnil
- Sandouville
- Sausseuzemare-en-Caux
- Tocqueville-les-Murs
- Les Trois-Pierres
- Vattetot-sous-Beaumont
- Virville

== Population ==
Historical population
Year	Pop.	±% p.a.
2013	33,148	—
2018	33,776	+0.38%
Source: INSEE

== See also ==
- Arrondissements of the Seine-Maritime department
- Cantons of the Seine-Maritime department
- Communes of the Seine-Maritime department
