= Houquetot =

- Commune
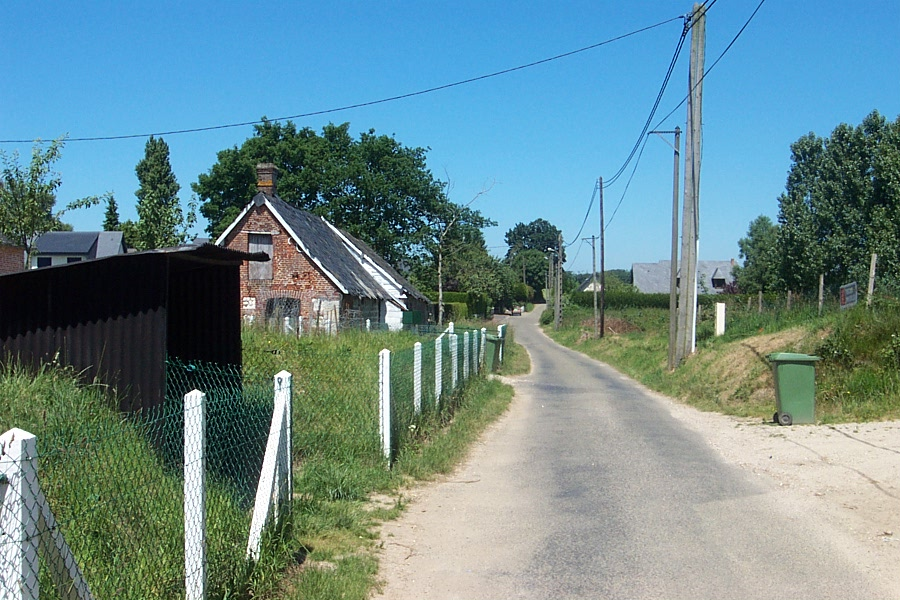
- A road in Houquetot
- Location of Houquetot
- Location within France Location within Normandy
- Coordinates: 49°36′19″N 0°23′23″E
- Country: France
- Region: Normandy
- Department: Seine-Maritime
- Arrondissement: Le Havre
- Canton: Saint-Romain-de-Colbosc
- Intercommunality: CC Campagne de Caux

Government
  - Mayor (2026–32): David Jézéquel
- Area^{1}: 4.09 km^{2} (1.58 sq mi)
- Elevation: 119 m (390 ft)
- Highest elevation: 132 m (433 ft)
- Lowest elevation: 104 m (341 ft)
- Population (2023): 350
  - Density: 86/km^{2} (220/sq mi)
- Time zone: UTC+01:00 (CET)
  - Summer (DST): UTC+02:00 (CEST)
- INSEE/Postal code: 76368 /76110
- ^{1} French Land Register data, which excludes lakes, ponds, glaciers > 1 km^{2} (0.386 sq mi or 247 acres) and river estuaries.

Houquetot (French pronunciation: [ukto]) is a commune in the Seine-Maritime department in the Normandy region in northern France.

== Geography ==
A small farming village situated in the Pays de Caux, some 12 miles (19 km) northeast of Le Havre, near the junction of the D252 and D910 roads.

== Population ==
Historical population
Year	Pop.	±% p.a.
1968	203	—
1975	168	−2.67%
1982	226	+4.33%
1990	268	+2.15%
1999	289	+0.84%
2007	302	+0.55%
2012	354	+3.23%
2017	353	−0.06%
2023	350	−0.14%
Source: INSEE

== Places of interest ==
- The church of St. Aubin, dating from the nineteenth century.
- A sixteenth century dovecote.

== See also ==
- Communes of the Seine-Maritime department
