= Daubeuf-Serville =

- Commune
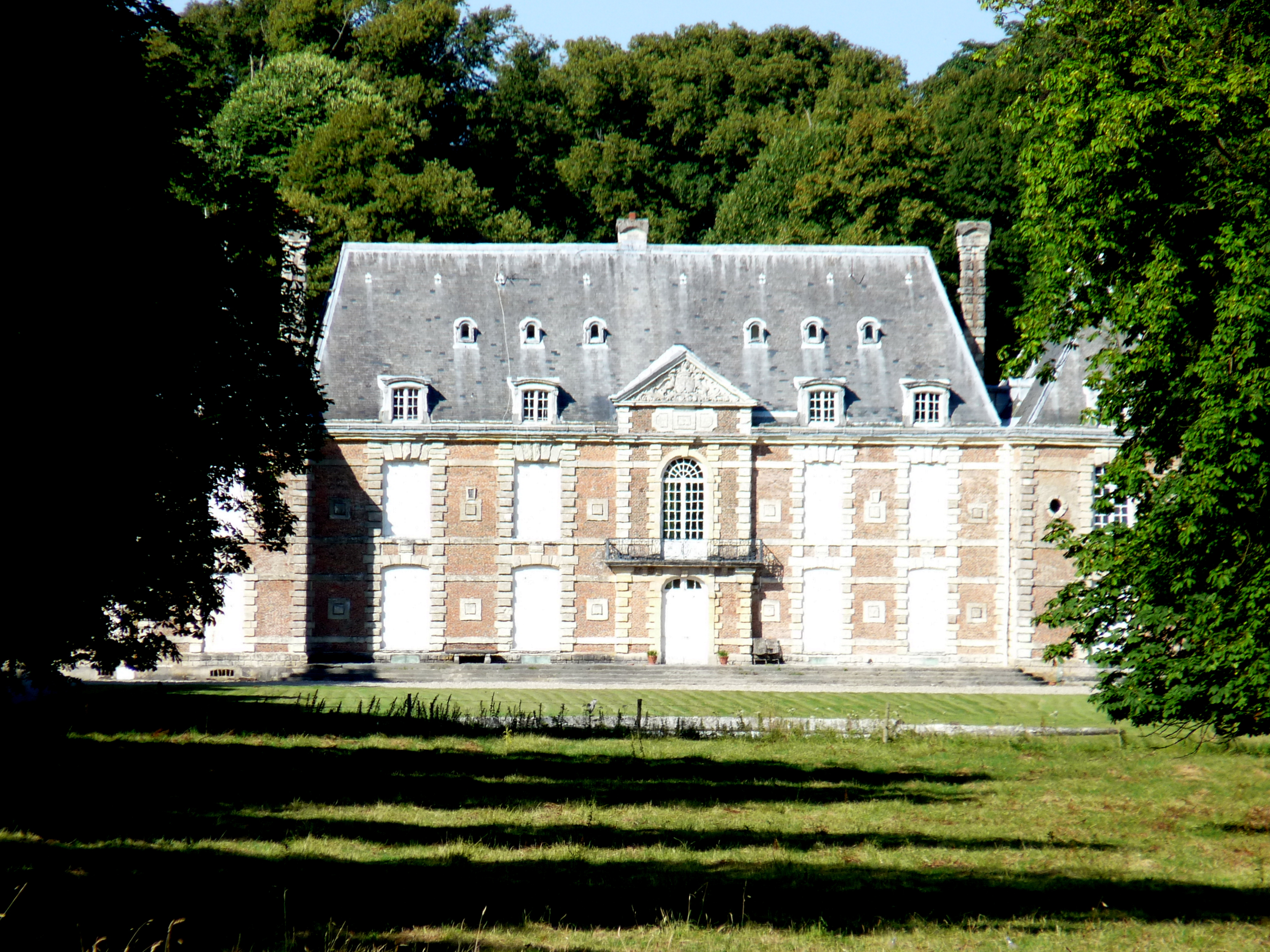
- The chateau in Daubeuf
- Location of Daubeuf-Serville
- Location within France Location within Normandy
- Coordinates: 49°41′47″N 0°28′40″E
- Country: France
- Region: Normandy
- Department: Seine-Maritime
- Arrondissement: Le Havre
- Canton: Saint-Romain-de-Colbosc
- Intercommunality: CC Campagne de Caux

Government
  - Mayor (2026–32): Pascal Delamare
- Area^{1}: 7.75 km^{2} (2.99 sq mi)
- Elevation: 50 m (160 ft)
- Highest elevation: 132 m (433 ft)
- Lowest elevation: 60 m (200 ft)
- Population (2023): 397
  - Density: 51.2/km^{2} (133/sq mi)
- Time zone: UTC+01:00 (CET)
  - Summer (DST): UTC+02:00 (CEST)
- INSEE/Postal code: 76213 /76110
- ^{1} French Land Register data, which excludes lakes, ponds, glaciers > 1 km^{2} (0.386 sq mi or 247 acres) and river estuaries.

Daubeuf-Serville (French pronunciation: [dobœf sɛʁvil]) is a commune in the Seine-Maritime department in the Normandy region of northern France.

== Geography ==
A small farming village situated in the Pays de Caux, some 21 miles (34 km) northeast of Le Havre, at the junction of the D28 and the D10 roads.

== Population ==
Historical population
Year	Pop.	±% p.a.
1968	349	—
1975	334	−0.63%
1982	412	+3.04%
1990	358	−1.74%
1999	322	−1.17%
2007	370	+1.75%
2012	376	+0.32%
2017	393	+0.89%
2023	397	+0.17%
Source: INSEE

== Places of interest ==
- The church of Notre-Dame, dating from the eleventh century.
- The church of St.Laurent, dating from the sixteenth century.
- Two 17th century chateaux.

== See also ==
- Communes of the Seine-Maritime department
