= Bénarville =

- Commune
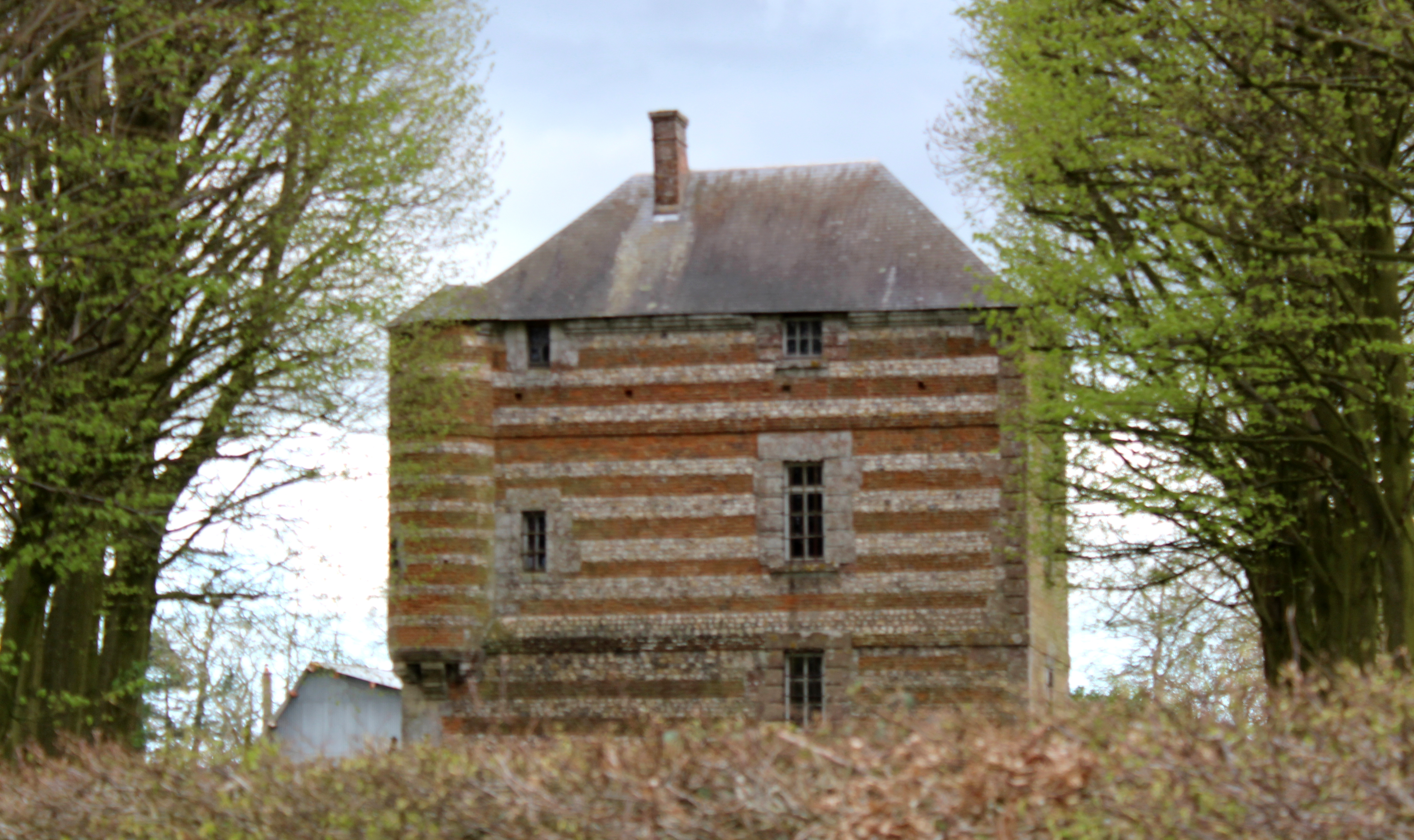
- The fortified house of the Bois-Rozé, in Bénarville

- Coat of arms
- Location of Bénarville
- Location within France Location within Normandy
- Coordinates: 49°40′25″N 0°29′33″E
- Country: France
- Region: Normandy
- Department: Seine-Maritime
- Arrondissement: Le Havre
- Canton: Saint-Romain-de-Colbosc
- Intercommunality: CC Campagne de Caux

Government
  - Mayor (2026–32): Isabelle Geulin
- Area^{1}: 4.36 km^{2} (1.68 sq mi)
- Elevation: 125 m (410 ft)
- Highest elevation: 136 m (446 ft)
- Lowest elevation: 75 m (246 ft)
- Population (2023): 260
  - Density: 60/km^{2} (150/sq mi)
- Time zone: UTC+01:00 (CET)
  - Summer (DST): UTC+02:00 (CEST)
- INSEE/Postal code: 76076 /76110
- ^{1} French Land Register data, which excludes lakes, ponds, glaciers > 1 km^{2} (0.386 sq mi or 247 acres) and river estuaries.

Bénarville (French pronunciation: [benaʁvil]) is a commune in the Seine-Maritime department in the Normandy region in northern France.

== Geography ==
A small farming village situated in the Pays de Caux, some 20 miles (32 km) northeast of Le Havre, at the junction of the D11 and D28 roads.

== Population ==
Historical population
Year	Pop.	±% p.a.
1968	169	—
1975	171	+0.17%
1982	190	+1.52%
1990	213	+1.44%
1999	193	−1.09%
2007	237	+2.60%
2012	243	+0.50%
2017	265	+1.75%
2023	260	−0.32%
Source: INSEE

== Places of interest ==
- The fifteenth century fortified house.
- The church of St.Germain, dating from the twelfth century.

== See also ==
- Communes of the Seine-Maritime department
