= Annouville-Vilmesnil =

- Commune
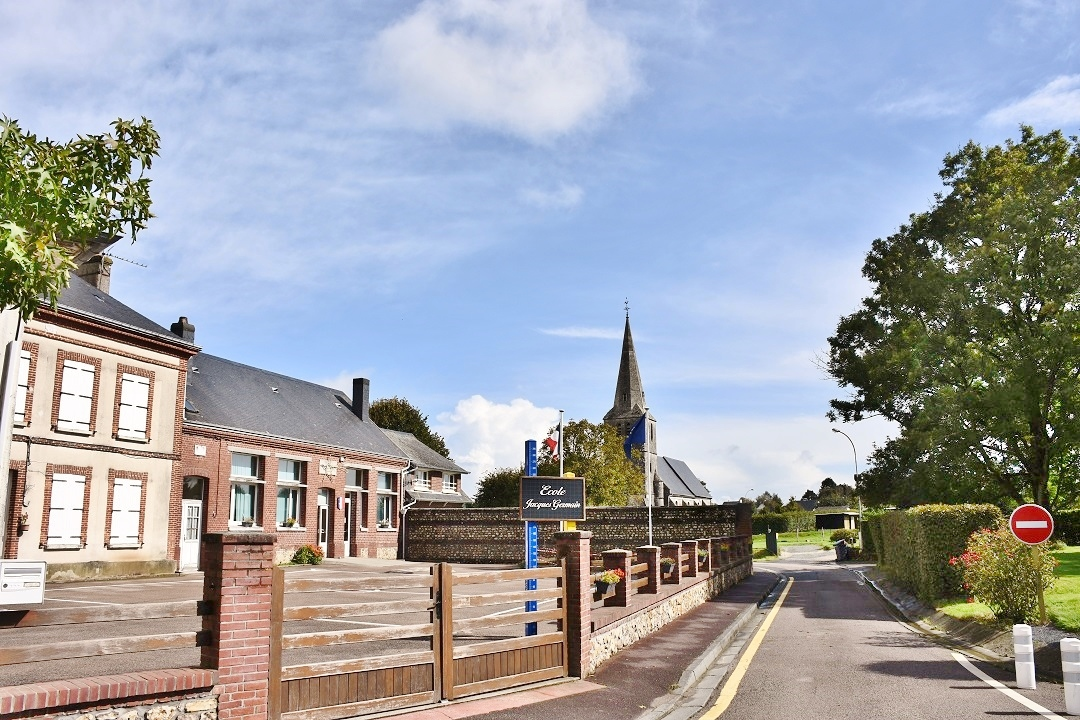
- A general view of Annouville-Vilmesnil

- Coat of arms
- Location of Annouville-Vilmesnil
- Location within France Location within Normandy
- Coordinates: 49°40′45″N 0°26′02″E
- Country: France
- Region: Normandy
- Department: Seine-Maritime
- Arrondissement: Le Havre
- Canton: Saint-Romain-de-Colbosc
- Intercommunality: CC Campagne de Caux

Government
  - Mayor (2022–2026): Pierre Rivoallan
- Area^{1}: 5.82 km^{2} (2.25 sq mi)
- Elevation: 136 m (446 ft)
- Highest elevation: 137 m (449 ft)
- Lowest elevation: 85 m (279 ft)
- Population (2023): 447
  - Density: 76.8/km^{2} (199/sq mi)
- Time zone: UTC+01:00 (CET)
  - Summer (DST): UTC+02:00 (CEST)
- INSEE/Postal code: 76021 /76110
- ^{1} French Land Register data, which excludes lakes, ponds, glaciers > 1 km^{2} (0.386 sq mi or 247 acres) and river estuaries.

Annouville-Vilmesnil (French pronunciation: [anuvil vilmenil]) is a commune in the Seine-Maritime department in the Normandy region in northern France.

== Geography ==
A farming village situated in the Pays de Caux, some 16 miles (26 km) northeast of Le Havre, at the junction of the D10, D69 and the D11.

== Heraldry ==
Arms of Annouville-Vilmesnil	The arms of Annouville-Vilmesnil are blazoned : Azure, 2 stalks of wheat slipped and leaved, in base a Gentian flower slipped and leaved, and on a chief Or, a bend gules charged with 3 plates (argent).

== Population ==
Historical population
Year	Pop.	±% p.a.
1968	290	—
1975	355	+2.93%
1982	356	+0.04%
1990	405	+1.63%
1999	385	−0.56%
2007	410	+0.79%
2012	543	+5.78%
2017	477	−2.56%
2023	447	−1.08%
Source: INSEE

== Places of interest ==
- The church of St. Germain, dating from the thirteenth century.
- Ruins of a medieval chateau.

== See also ==
- Communes of the Seine-Maritime department
