= Bornambusc =

- Commune
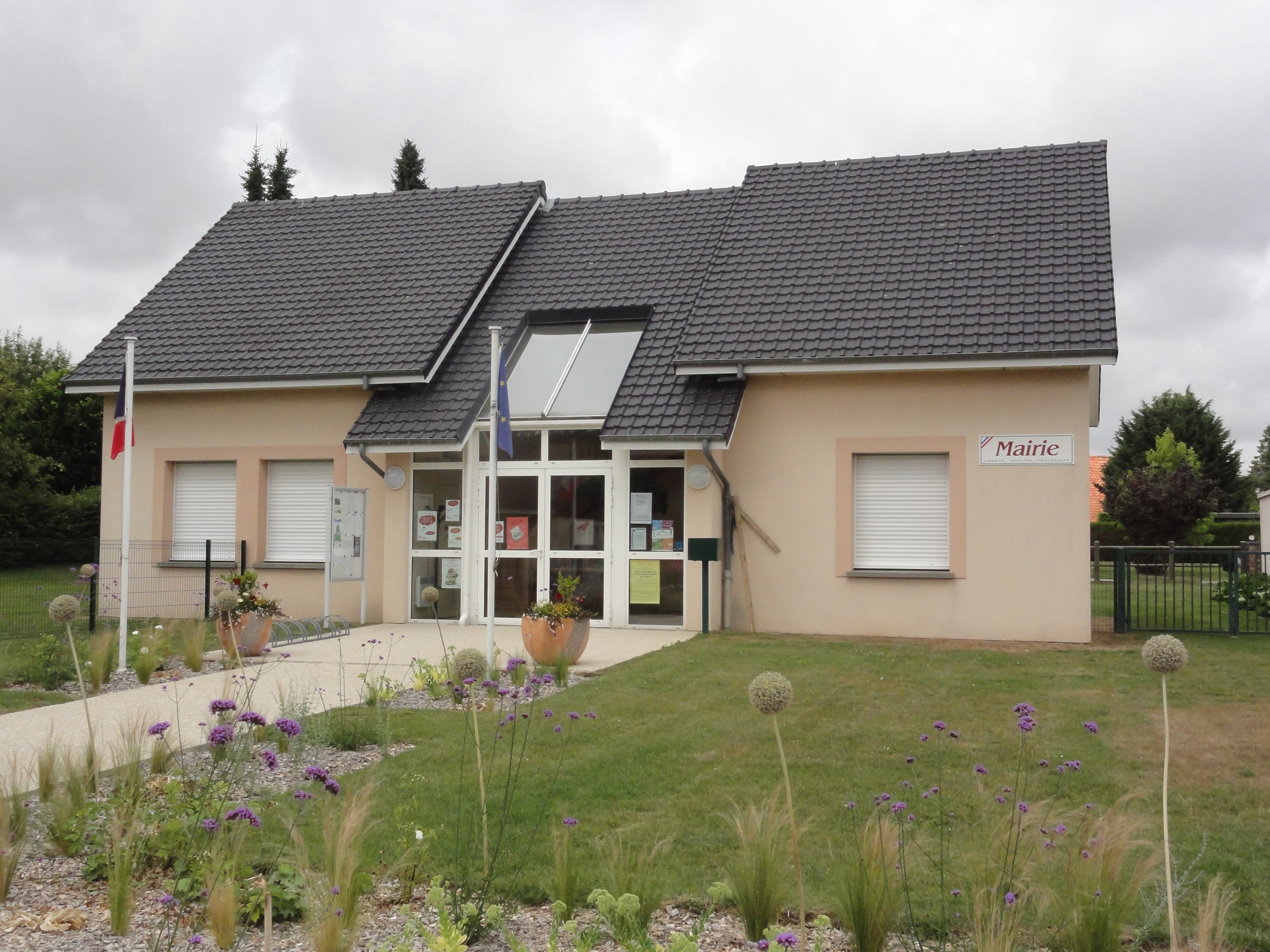
- Bornambusc Town hall

- Coat of arms
- Location of Bornambusc
- Location within France Location within Normandy
- Coordinates: 49°37′40″N 0°21′09″E
- Country: France
- Region: Normandy
- Department: Seine-Maritime
- Arrondissement: Le Havre
- Canton: Saint-Romain-de-Colbosc
- Intercommunality: CC Campagne de Caux

Government
  - Mayor (2026–32): David Fleury
- Area^{1}: 4.11 km^{2} (1.59 sq mi)
- Elevation: 120 m (390 ft)
- Highest elevation: 137 m (449 ft)
- Lowest elevation: 103 m (338 ft)
- Population (2023): 245
  - Density: 59.6/km^{2} (154/sq mi)
- Time zone: UTC+01:00 (CET)
  - Summer (DST): UTC+02:00 (CEST)
- INSEE/Postal code: 76118 /76110
- ^{1} French Land Register data, which excludes lakes, ponds, glaciers > 1 km^{2} (0.386 sq mi or 247 acres) and river estuaries.

Bornambusc is a commune in the Seine-Maritime department in the Normandy region in northern France.

== Heraldry ==
The helmet belongs to the d'Harnois de Blangues family.

== Geography ==
A small village situated in the Pays de Caux, some 14 miles (23 km) northeast of Le Havre, served by the D10 road. Guy de Maupassant spent time hunting in the Château de Bornambusc (a medieval Jagdschloss) throughout his life, visiting his cousin and dear friend Germer d'Harnois de Blangues. The author was inspired by his cousin's property whose descriptions appear in many of his works, particularly in his novel "Une Vie".

== Population ==
Historical population
Year	Pop.	±% p.a.
1968	183	—
1975	191	+0.61%
1982	218	+1.91%
1990	231	+0.73%
1999	241	+0.47%
2007	258	+0.86%
2012	279	+1.58%
2017	260	−1.40%
2023	245	−0.99%
Source: INSEE

== Places of interest ==
- The ruins of the 13th century chateau of Clércy.
- The church of St.Laurent, with parts dating from the thirteenth century.

== See also ==
- Communes of the Seine-Maritime department
