= Auberville-la-Renault =

- Commune
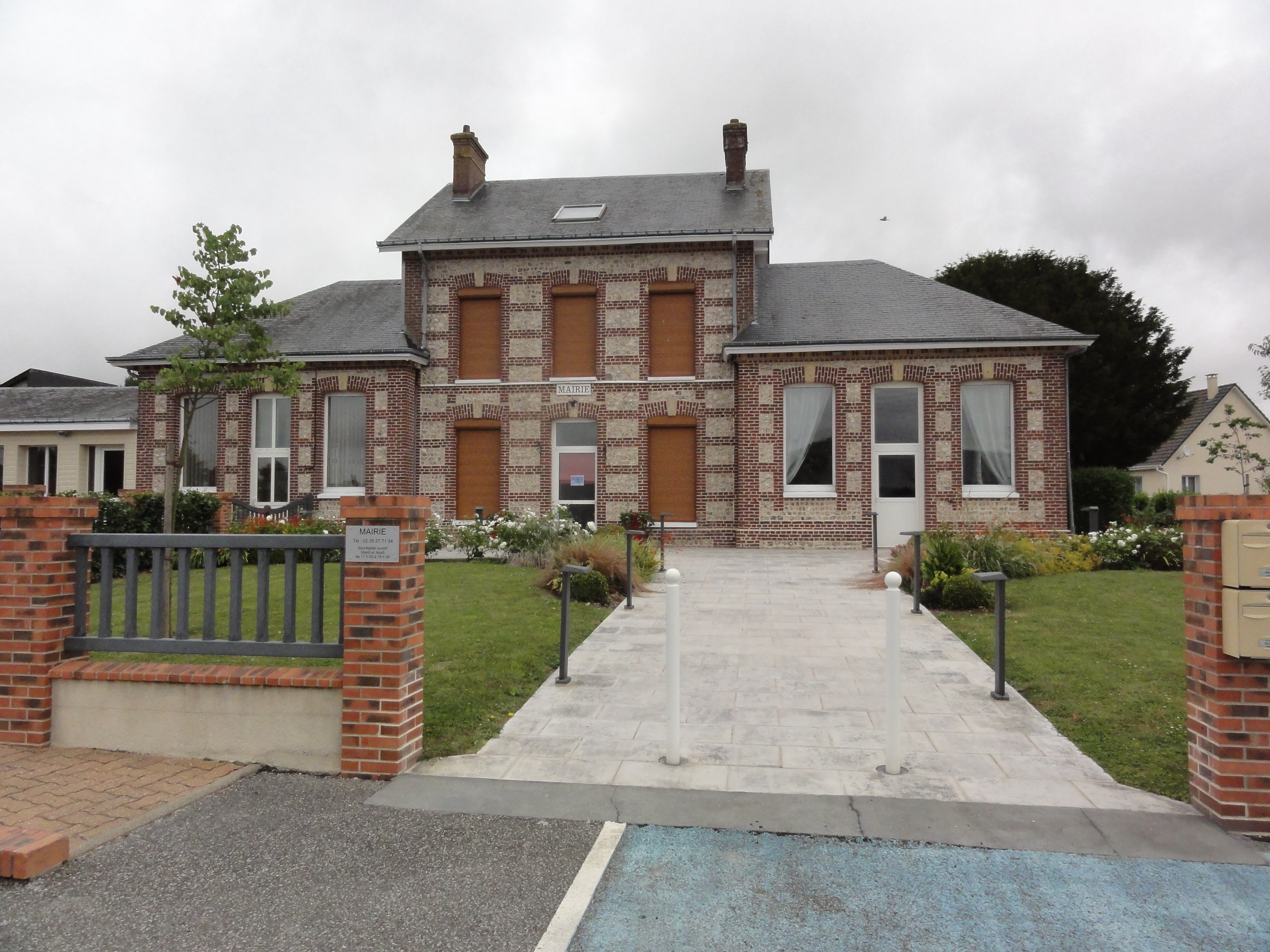
- Town hall

- Coat of arms
- Location of Auberville-la-Renault
- Location within France Location within Normandy
- Coordinates: 49°40′56″N 0°22′01″E
- Country: France
- Region: Normandy
- Department: Seine-Maritime
- Arrondissement: Le Havre
- Canton: Saint-Romain-de-Colbosc
- Intercommunality: CC Campagne Caux

Government
  - Mayor (2026–32): David Poret
- Area^{1}: 4.96 km^{2} (1.92 sq mi)
- Elevation: 111 m (364 ft)
- Highest elevation: 124 m (407 ft)
- Lowest elevation: 88 m (289 ft)
- Population (2023): 449
  - Density: 90.5/km^{2} (234/sq mi)
- Time zone: UTC+01:00 (CET)
  - Summer (DST): UTC+02:00 (CEST)
- INSEE/Postal code: 76033 /76110
- ^{1} French Land Register data, which excludes lakes, ponds, glaciers > 1 km^{2} (0.386 sq mi or 247 acres) and river estuaries.

Auberville-la-Renault is a commune in the Seine-Maritime department in the Normandy region in northern France.

== Geography ==
A farming village situated in the Pays de Caux, some 18 miles (29 km) northeast of Le Havre, at the junction of the D68 and the D925.

== Heraldry ==
Arms of Auberville-la-Renault	The arms of Auberville-la-Renault are blazoned : Azure, on a fess wavy between 2 billets argent and saltire couped Or, a millwheel gules.

== Population ==
Historical population
Year	Pop.	±% p.a.
1968	262	—
1975	291	+1.51%
1982	294	+0.15%
1990	347	+2.09%
1999	347	+0.00%
2007	388	+1.41%
2012	451	+3.05%
2017	462	+0.48%
2023	449	−0.47%
Source: INSEE

== Places of interest ==
- The church of St.Maclou, dating from the thirteenth century.
- Ruins of a medieval castle donjon.
- The nineteenth-century château de Glatigny.
- Traces of the old château d'Alvémont, now a farm.

== See also ==
- Communes of the Seine-Maritime department
