= Saint-Sauveur-d'Émalleville =

- Commune
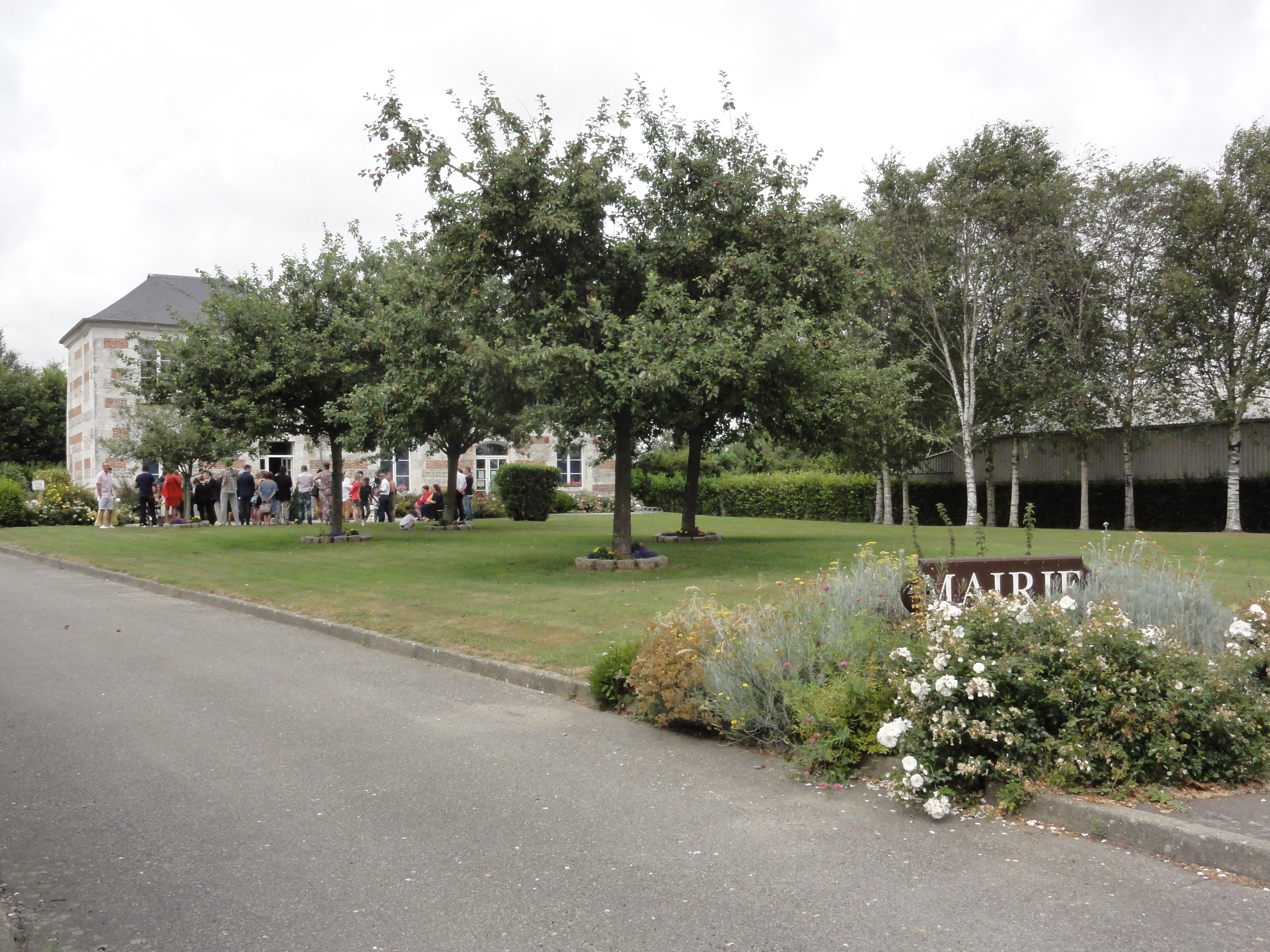
- Town hall

- Coat of arms
- Location of Saint-Sauveur-d'Émalleville
- Location within France Location within Normandy
- Coordinates: 49°36′46″N 0°17′59″E
- Country: France
- Region: Normandy
- Department: Seine-Maritime
- Arrondissement: Le Havre
- Canton: Saint-Romain-de-Colbosc
- Intercommunality: CC Campagne de Caux

Government
  - Mayor (2020–2026): Anthony Bayou
- Area^{1}: 7.48 km^{2} (2.89 sq mi)
- Elevation: 120 m (390 ft)
- Highest elevation: 137 m (449 ft)
- Lowest elevation: 104 m (341 ft)
- Population (2023): 1,181
  - Density: 158/km^{2} (409/sq mi)
- Time zone: UTC+01:00 (CET)
  - Summer (DST): UTC+02:00 (CEST)
- INSEE/Postal code: 76650 /76110
- ^{1} French Land Register data, which excludes lakes, ponds, glaciers > 1 km^{2} (0.386 sq mi or 247 acres) and river estuaries.

Saint-Sauveur-d'Émalleville (French pronunciation: [sɛ̃ sovœʁ demalvil]) is a commune in the Seine-Maritime department in the Normandy region in northern France.

== Geography ==
A farming village in the Pays de Caux, situated some 12 miles (19 km) northeast of Le Havre, on the D925 road.

== Heraldry ==
Arms of Saint-Sauveur-d'Émalleville	The arms of Saint-Sauveur-d'Émalleville are blazoned : Or, 3 hammers gules, on a chief indented azure a lion passant argent.

== Population ==
Historical population
Year	Pop.	±% p.a.
1968	321	—
1975	428	+4.20%
1982	782	+8.99%
1990	862	+1.22%
1999	968	+1.30%
2007	1,165	+2.34%
2012	1,191	+0.44%
2017	1,214	+0.38%
2023	1,181	−0.46%
Source: INSEE

== Places of interest ==
- The thirteenth-century church at the priory of St. Sauveur.
- The church of St. Anne, dating from the twelfth century.

== See also ==
- Communes of the Seine-Maritime department
