= Bretteville-du-Grand-Caux =

- Commune
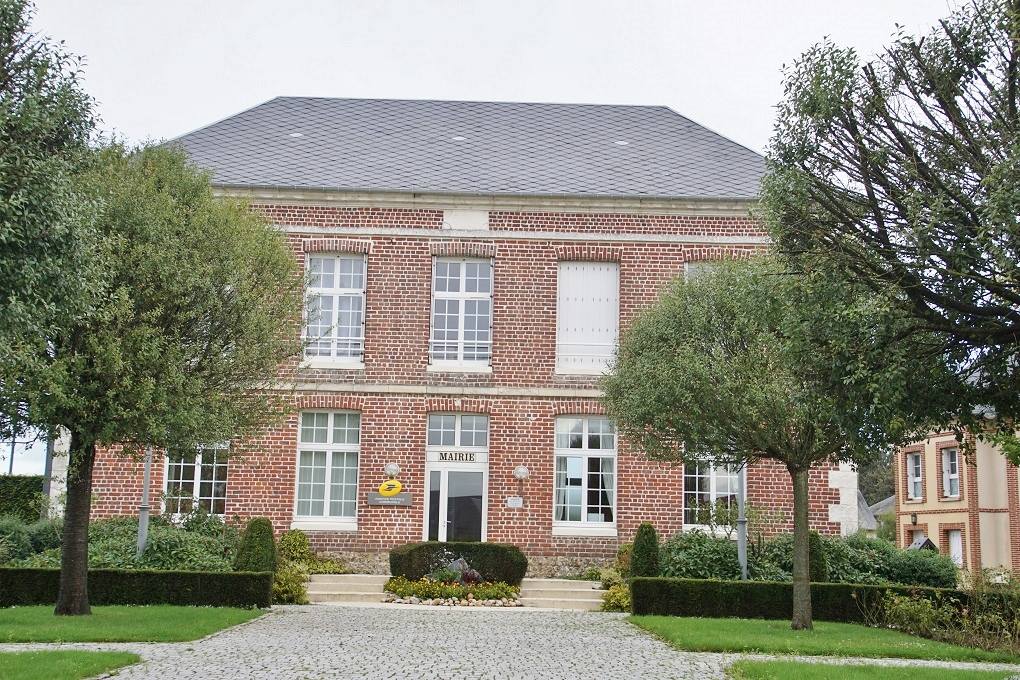
- The town hall in Bretteville-du-Grand-Caux

- Coat of arms
- Location of Bretteville-du-Grand-Caux
- Location within France Location within Normandy
- Coordinates: 49°39′55″N 0°23′37″E
- Country: France
- Region: Normandy
- Department: Seine-Maritime
- Arrondissement: Le Havre
- Canton: Saint-Romain-de-Colbosc
- Intercommunality: CC Campagne de Caux

Government
  - Mayor (2026–32): André-Pierre Blondel
- Area^{1}: 11.41 km^{2} (4.41 sq mi)
- Elevation: 106 m (348 ft)
- Highest elevation: 129 m (423 ft)
- Lowest elevation: 88 m (289 ft)
- Population (2023): 1,405
  - Density: 123.1/km^{2} (318.9/sq mi)
- Time zone: UTC+01:00 (CET)
  - Summer (DST): UTC+02:00 (CEST)
- INSEE/Postal code: 76143 /76110
- ^{1} French Land Register data, which excludes lakes, ponds, glaciers > 1 km^{2} (0.386 sq mi or 247 acres) and river estuaries.

Bretteville-du-Grand-Caux (French pronunciation: [bʁɛtvil dy ɡʁɑ̃ ko]) is a commune in the Seine-Maritime department in the Normandy region in northern France.

== Geography ==
A farming village situated in the Pays de Caux, some 15 miles (24 km) northeast of Le Havre, served by the D10e road.

== Heraldry ==
Arms of Bretteville-du-Grand-Caux	The arms of Bretteville-du-Grand-Caux are blazoned : Azure, a fess brettessed between 3 roses Or, and a chief fusilly argent and gules.

== Population ==
Historical population
Year	Pop.	±% p.a.
1968	871	—
1975	774	−1.67%
1982	874	+1.75%
1990	1,006	+1.77%
1999	1,134	+1.34%
2007	1,267	+1.40%
2012	1,299	+0.50%
2017	1,345	+0.70%
2023	1,405	+0.73%
Source: INSEE

== Places of interest ==
- The remains of a feudal manorhouse, nowadays a restaurant.
- The church of Notre-Dame, with parts dating from the eleventh century.

== See also ==
- Communes of the Seine-Maritime department
