= Tocqueville-les-Murs =

- Commune
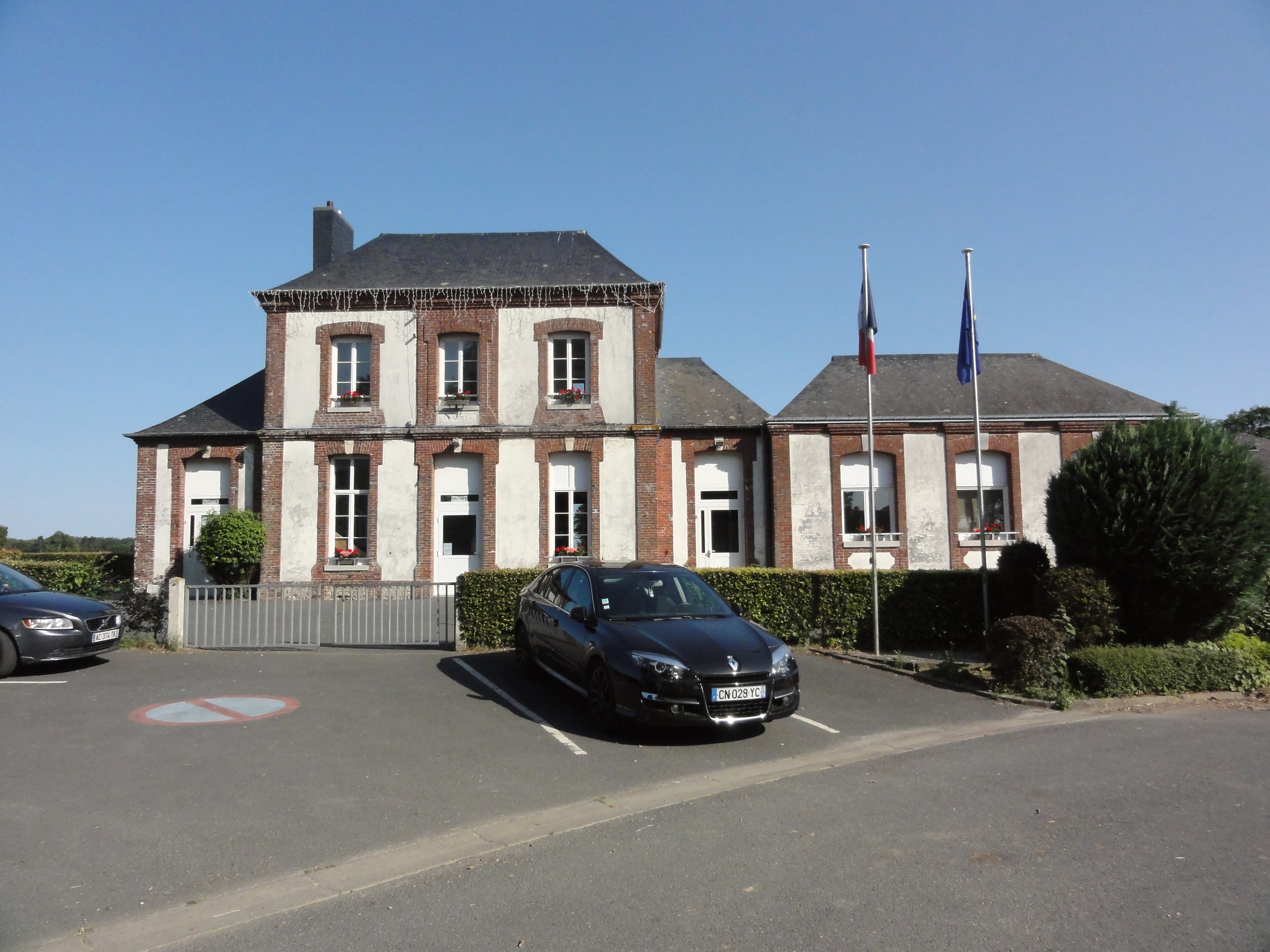
- Town hall

- Coat of arms
- Location of Tocqueville-les-Murs
- Location within France Location within Normandy
- Coordinates: 49°39′59″N 0°30′19″E
- Country: France
- Region: Normandy
- Department: Seine-Maritime
- Arrondissement: Le Havre
- Canton: Saint-Romain-de-Colbosc
- Intercommunality: CC Campagne de Caux

Government
  - Mayor (2026–32): Gervais Goupil
- Area^{1}: 3.47 km^{2} (1.34 sq mi)
- Elevation: 135 m (443 ft)
- Highest elevation: 138 m (453 ft)
- Lowest elevation: 114 m (374 ft)
- Population (2023): 272
  - Density: 78.4/km^{2} (203/sq mi)
- Time zone: UTC+01:00 (CET)
  - Summer (DST): UTC+02:00 (CEST)
- INSEE/Postal code: 76695 /76110
- ^{1} French Land Register data, which excludes lakes, ponds, glaciers > 1 km^{2} (0.386 sq mi or 247 acres) and river estuaries.

Tocqueville-les-Murs (French pronunciation: [tɔkvil le myʁ], before 1962: Tocqueville) is a commune in the Seine-Maritime department in the Normandy region in northern France.

== Geography ==
A farming village in the Pays de Caux, situated some 22 miles (35 km) northeast of Le Havre, at the junction of the D11, D28 and D75 roads.

== Population ==
Historical population
Year	Pop.	±% p.a.
1968	185	—
1975	171	−1.12%
1982	236	+4.71%
1990	223	−0.71%
1999	209	−0.72%
2007	283	+3.86%
2012	319	+2.42%
2017	278	−2.71%
2023	272	−0.36%
Source: INSEE

== Places of interest ==
- The church of St. Germain, dating from the twelfth century.
- The nineteenth-century chateau.
- Traces of a feudal castle.

== See also ==
- Communes of the Seine-Maritime department
