= Saint-Maclou-la-Brière =

- Commune
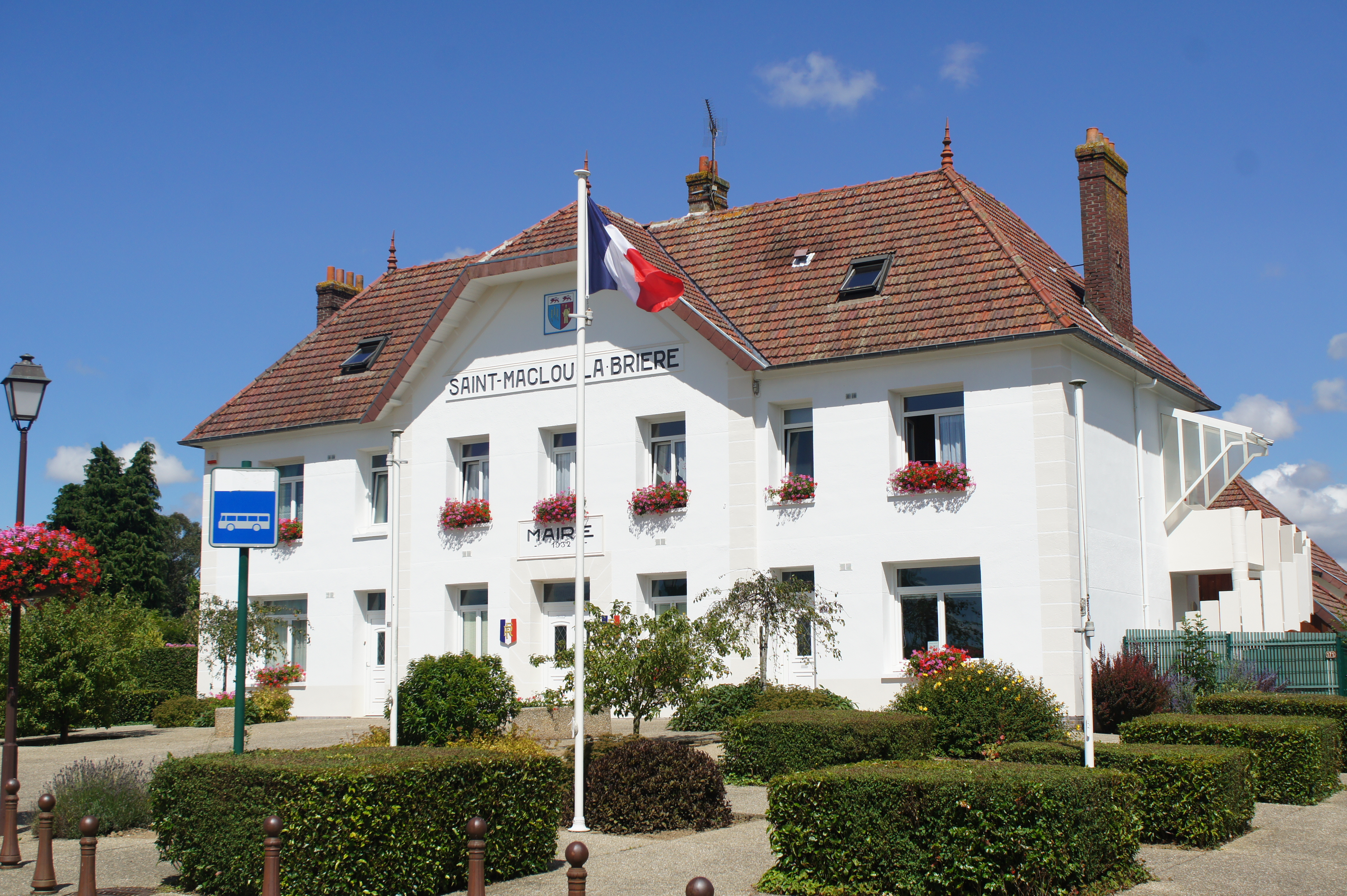
- The town hall in Saint-Maclou-la-Brière

- Coat of arms
- Location of Saint-Maclou-la-Brière
- Location within France Location within Normandy
- Coordinates: 49°39′19″N 0°28′02″E
- Country: France
- Region: Normandy
- Department: Seine-Maritime
- Arrondissement: Le Havre
- Canton: Saint-Romain-de-Colbosc
- Intercommunality: CC Campagne de Caux

Government
  - Mayor (2020–2026): Antonio Quesada
- Area^{1}: 4.96 km^{2} (1.92 sq mi)
- Elevation: 135 m (443 ft)
- Highest elevation: 136 m (446 ft)
- Lowest elevation: 100 m (330 ft)
- Population (2023): 476
  - Density: 96.0/km^{2} (249/sq mi)
- Time zone: UTC+01:00 (CET)
  - Summer (DST): UTC+02:00 (CEST)
- INSEE/Postal code: 76603 /76110
- ^{1} French Land Register data, which excludes lakes, ponds, glaciers > 1 km^{2} (0.386 sq mi or 247 acres) and river estuaries.

Saint-Maclou-la-Brière (French pronunciation: [sɛ̃ maklu la bʁijɛʁ]) is a commune in the Seine-Maritime department in the Normandy region in northern France.

== Geography ==
A farming village in the Pays de Caux, situated some 21 miles (34 km) northeast of Le Havre, at the junction of the D104 and D75 roads.

== Heraldry ==
Arms of Saint-Maclou-la-Brière	The arms of Saint-Maclou-la-Brière are blazoned : Per pale 1: Azure, 3 stalks of wheat slipped and leaved Or 1 and 2; 2: Gules, St. Maclou with his crozier Or; and on a chief argent, 2 leopards gules.

== Population ==
Historical population
Year	Pop.	±% p.a.
1968	302	—
1975	284	−0.87%
1982	368	+3.77%
1990	392	+0.79%
1999	417	+0.69%
2007	486	+1.93%
2012	498	+0.49%
2017	477	−0.86%
2023	476	−0.03%
Source: INSEE

== Places of interest ==
- The church of St. Maclou, dating from the seventeenth century.

== See also ==
- Communes of the Seine-Maritime department
