= Bréauté =

- Commune
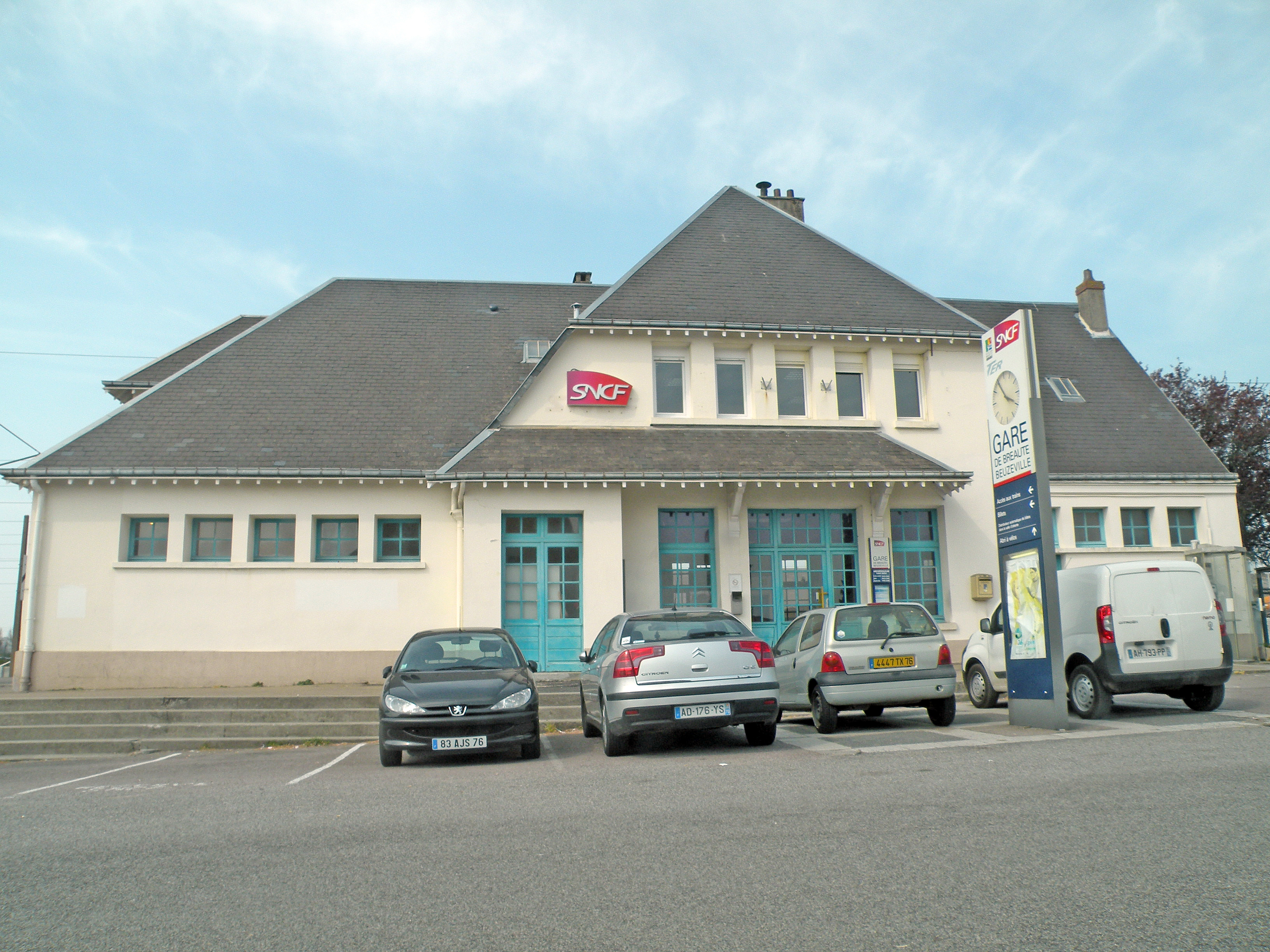
- Bréauté-Beuzeville railway station

- Coat of arms
- Location of Bréauté
- Location within France Location within Normandy
- Coordinates: 49°37′46″N 0°24′01″E
- Country: France
- Region: Normandy
- Department: Seine-Maritime
- Arrondissement: Le Havre
- Canton: Saint-Romain-de-Colbosc
- Intercommunality: CC Campagne de Caux

Government
  - Mayor (2026–32): Jean-Claude Malo
- Area^{1}: 13.91 km^{2} (5.37 sq mi)
- Elevation: 130 m (430 ft)
- Highest elevation: 137 m (449 ft)
- Lowest elevation: 93 m (305 ft)
- Population (2023): 1,329
  - Density: 95.54/km^{2} (247.5/sq mi)
- Time zone: UTC+01:00 (CET)
  - Summer (DST): UTC+02:00 (CEST)
- INSEE/Postal code: 76141 /76110
- ^{1} French Land Register data, which excludes lakes, ponds, glaciers > 1 km^{2} (0.386 sq mi or 247 acres) and river estuaries.

Bréauté (French pronunciation: [bʁeote]) is a commune in the Seine-Maritime department of the Normandy region in northern France.

== Geography ==
It a is farming village situated in the Pays de Caux, approximately 17 miles (27 km) northeast of Le Havre, at the junction of the D52 and D910 roads.

=== Heraldry ===
Arms of Bréauté	The arms of Bréauté are blazoned : Argent, a cinqfoil gules.

== Population ==
Historical population
Year	Pop.	±% p.a.
1968	978	—
1975	990	+0.17%
1982	1,104	+1.57%
1990	1,052	−0.60%
1999	1,102	+0.52%
2007	1,236	+1.44%
2012	1,318	+1.29%
2017	1,340	+0.33%
2023	1,329	−0.14%
Source: INSEE

== Places of interest ==
- The eighteenth-century château d’Anteville.
- The church of St. Georges, with parts dating from the eleventh century.

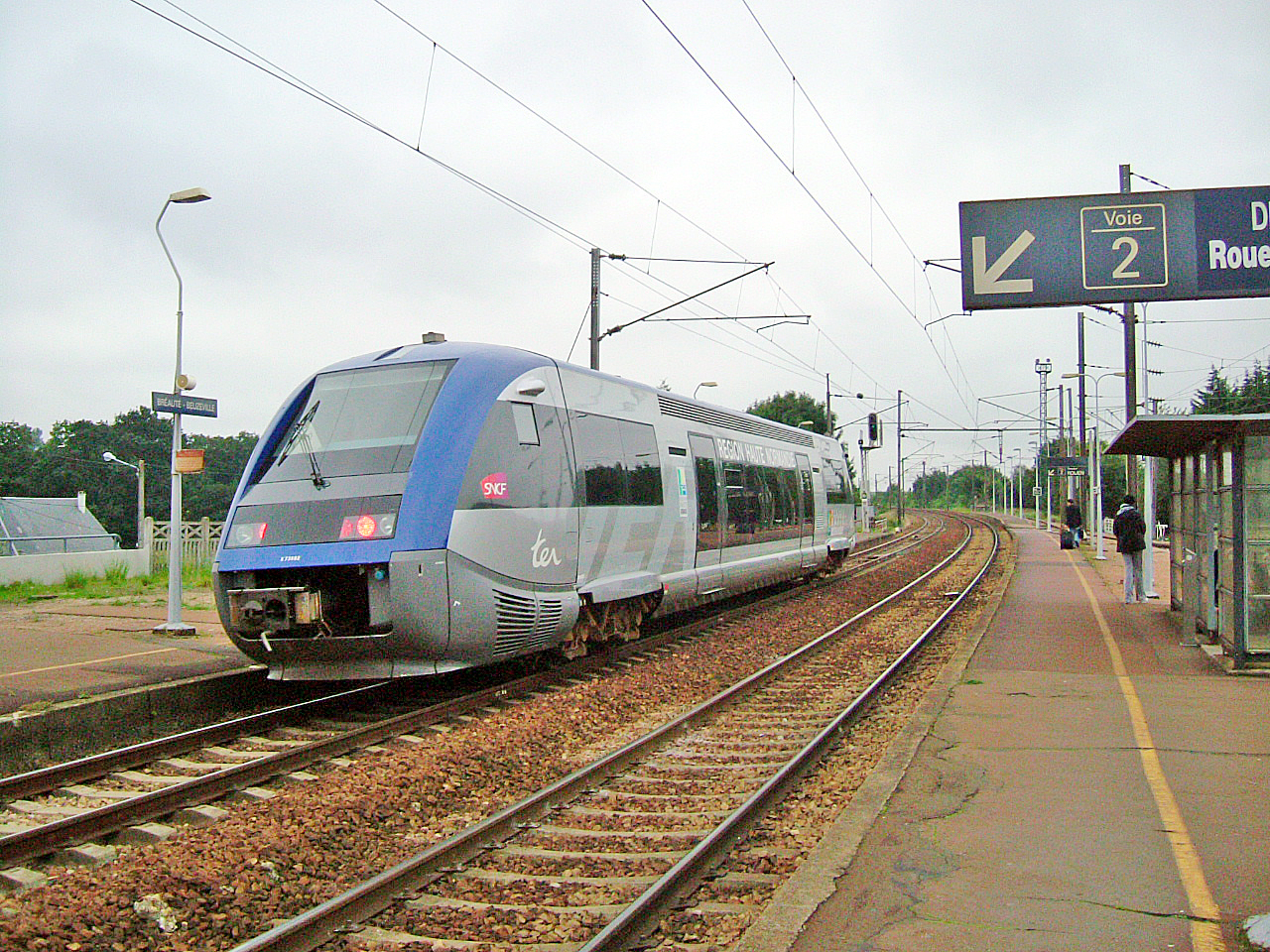
TER Class X locomotive at Bréauté station

== See also ==
- Communes of the Seine-Maritime department
- Falkes de Bréauté
