= Grainville-Ymauville =

- Commune
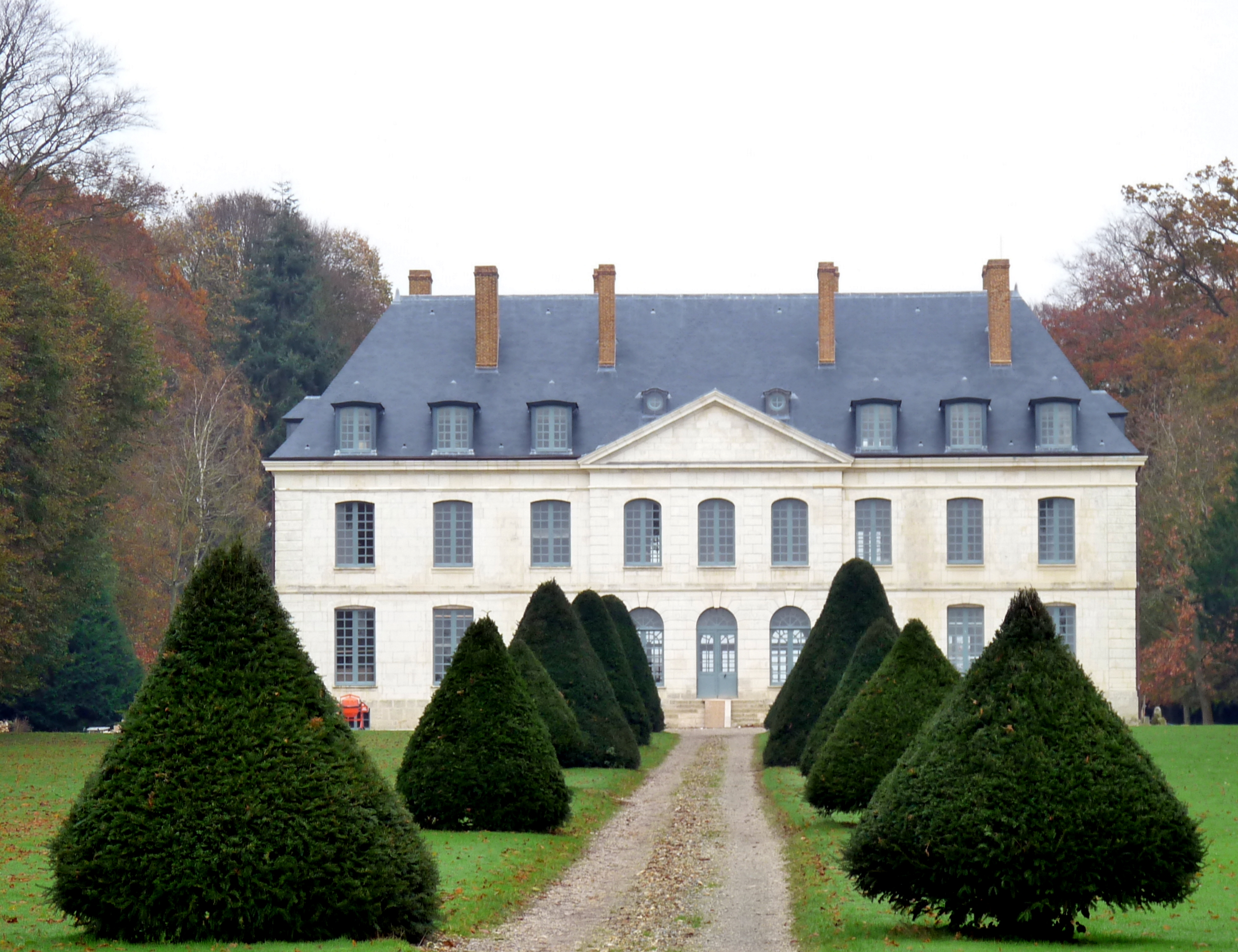
- The chateau of Trébons in Grainville-Ymauville

- Coat of arms
- Location of Grainville-Ymauville
- Location within France Location within Normandy
- Coordinates: 49°39′30″N 0°25′00″E
- Country: France
- Region: Normandy
- Department: Seine-Maritime
- Arrondissement: Le Havre
- Canton: Saint-Romain-de-Colbosc
- Intercommunality: CC Campagne de Caux

Government
  - Mayor (2020–2026): Serge Girard
- Area^{1}: 6.29 km^{2} (2.43 sq mi)
- Elevation: 105 m (344 ft)
- Highest elevation: 135 m (443 ft)
- Lowest elevation: 93 m (305 ft)
- Population (2023): 428
  - Density: 68.0/km^{2} (176/sq mi)
- Time zone: UTC+01:00 (CET)
  - Summer (DST): UTC+02:00 (CEST)
- INSEE/Postal code: 76317 /76110
- ^{1} French Land Register data, which excludes lakes, ponds, glaciers > 1 km^{2} (0.386 sq mi or 247 acres) and river estuaries.

Grainville-Ymauville (French pronunciation: [ɡʁɛ̃vil imovil]) is a commune in the Seine-Maritime department in the Normandy region in northern France.

== Geography ==
A farming village situated in the Pays de Caux, some 19 miles (31 km) northeast of Le Havre, at the junction of the D75 and D10 roads. The SNCF railways have a station here.

== Heraldry ==
| Arms of Grainville-Ymauville | The arms of Grainville-Ymauville are blazoned : Azure, a chevron argent and in base 6 stalks of wheat arranged as a fan Or, and on a chief argent, 3 roses gules slipped and leaved vert. |

== Population ==
Historical population
| Year | Pop. | ±% p.a. |
|---|---|---|
| 1968 | 255 | — |
| 1975 | 232 | −1.34% |
| 1982 | 317 | +4.56% |
| 1990 | 334 | +0.66% |
| 1999 | 392 | +1.80% |
| 2007 | 404 | +0.38% |
| 2012 | 416 | +0.59% |
| 2017 | 439 | +1.08% |
| 2023 | 428 | −0.42% |
Source: INSEE

== Places of interest ==
- The church of St-Vigor-et-Notre-Dame, dating from the eighteenth century.
- The eighteenth century chateau de Grainville.

== Notable people ==
- Nicole Fontaine, former president of the European Parliament was born here.

== See also ==
- Communes of the Seine-Maritime department
