= Mentheville =

- Commune
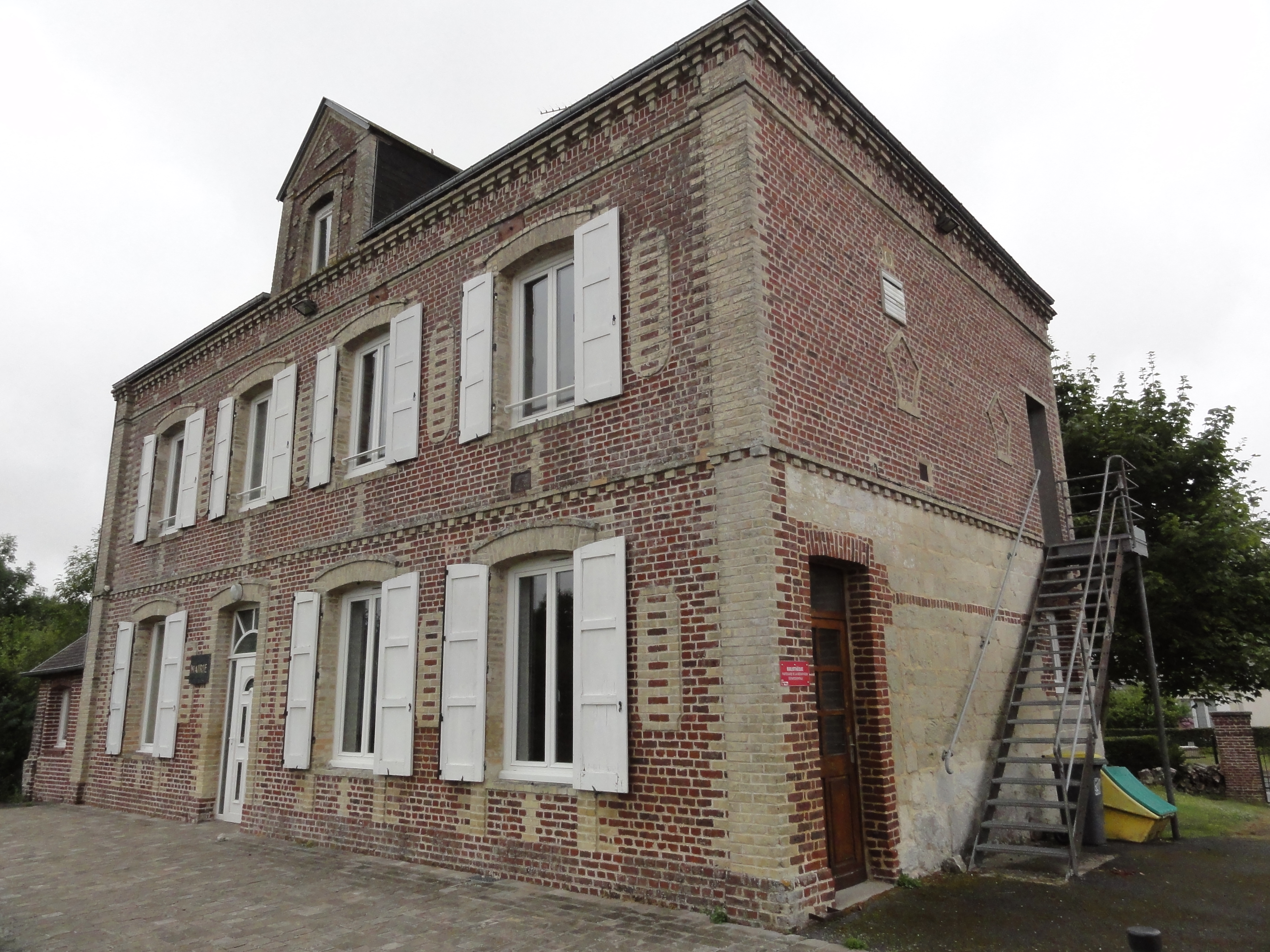
- Town hall
- Location of Mentheville
- Location within France Location within Normandy
- Coordinates: 49°41′31″N 0°24′36″E
- Country: France
- Region: Normandy
- Department: Seine-Maritime
- Arrondissement: Le Havre
- Canton: Saint-Romain-de-Colbosc
- Intercommunality: CC Campagne de Caux

Government
  - Mayor (2020–2026): Franck Remond
- Area^{1}: 3.08 km^{2} (1.19 sq mi)
- Elevation: 125 m (410 ft)
- Highest elevation: 132 m (433 ft)
- Lowest elevation: 85 m (279 ft)
- Population (2023): 302
  - Density: 98.1/km^{2} (254/sq mi)
- Time zone: UTC+01:00 (CET)
  - Summer (DST): UTC+02:00 (CEST)
- INSEE/Postal code: 76425 /76110
- ^{1} French Land Register data, which excludes lakes, ponds, glaciers > 1 km^{2} (0.386 sq mi or 247 acres) and river estuaries.

Mentheville (French pronunciation: [mɑ̃tvil]) is a commune in the Seine-Maritime department in the Normandy region in northern France.

== Geography ==
Mentheville is a small farming village in the Pays de Caux situated some 22 miles (35 km) northeast of Le Havre at the junction of the D11 and D75 roads.

== Population ==
Historical population
Year	Pop.	±% p.a.
1968	166	—
1975	127	−3.75%
1982	137	+1.09%
1990	133	−0.37%
1999	158	+1.93%
2007	216	+3.99%
2012	270	+4.56%
2017	301	+2.20%
2023	302	+0.06%
Source: INSEE

== Places of interest ==
- The church of Notre-Dame, dating from the seventeenth century.
- Two sixteenth-century houses.
- The seventeenth-century château.

== See also ==
- Communes of the Seine-Maritime department
