= Angerville-Bailleul =

- Commune
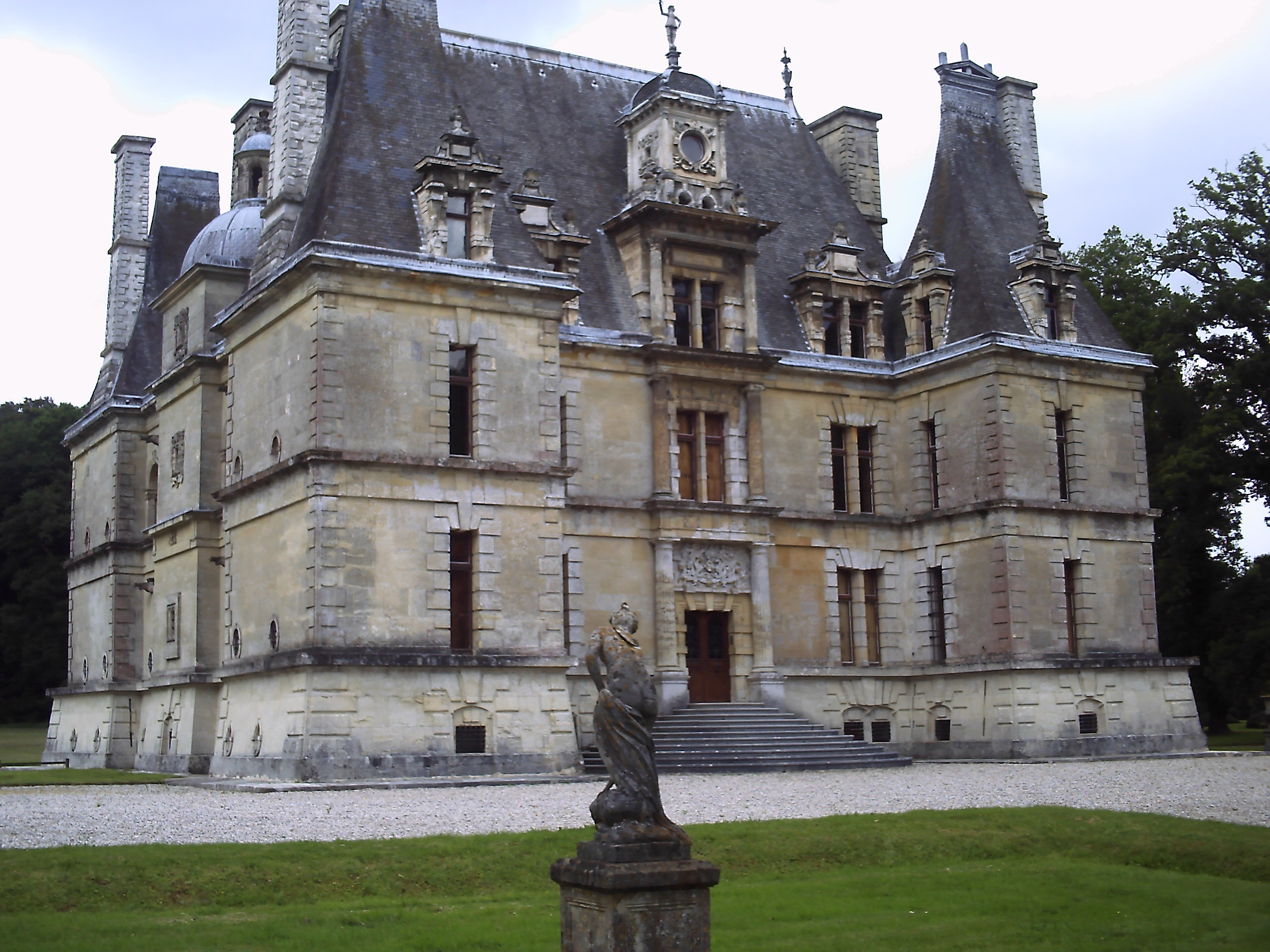
- The chateau of Bailleul
- Location of Angerville-Bailleul
- Location within France Location within Normandy
- Coordinates: 49°40′03″N 0°27′20″E
- Country: France
- Region: Normandy
- Department: Seine-Maritime
- Arrondissement: Le Havre
- Canton: Saint-Romain-de-Colbosc
- Intercommunality: Campagne de Caux

Government
  - Mayor (2020–2026): Huguette Lesauvage
- Area^{1}: 4.59 km^{2} (1.77 sq mi)
- Elevation: 122 m (400 ft)
- Highest elevation: 136 m (446 ft)
- Lowest elevation: 93 m (305 ft)
- Population (2023): 196
  - Density: 42.7/km^{2} (111/sq mi)
- Time zone: UTC+01:00 (CET)
  - Summer (DST): UTC+02:00 (CEST)
- INSEE/Postal code: 76012 /76110
- ^{1} French Land Register data, which excludes lakes, ponds, glaciers > 1 km^{2} (0.386 sq mi or 247 acres) and river estuaries.

Angerville-Bailleul (French pronunciation: [ɑ̃ʒɛʁvil bajœl]) is a commune in the Seine-Maritime department in the Normandy region in northern France.

== Geography ==
A small farming village situated in the Pays de Caux, some 16 miles (26 km) northeast of Le Havre, at the junction of the D11 and the D273.

== Population ==
Historical population
Year	Pop.	±% p.a.
1968	196	—
1975	192	−0.29%
1982	189	−0.22%
1990	212	+1.45%
1999	203	−0.48%
2007	191	−0.76%
2012	212	+2.11%
2017	191	−2.06%
2023	196	+0.43%
Source: INSEE

== Places of interest ==
- The church of Saint-Medard, dating from the thirteenth century
- The sixteenth-century château de Bailleul and its surrounding parkland.
- The chapel of the chateau, dating from the sixteenth century

== See also ==
- Communes of the Seine-Maritime department
