= Communauté de communes Cœur de Caux =

Coordinates: 49.6545°N 0.5915°E

Cœur de Caux
- Former communauté de communes
- Interactive map of Cœur de Caux
- Country: France
- Region: Normandy
- Department: Seine-Maritime
- No. of communes: {{{nbcomm}}}
- Established: 31 December 1999
- Disbanded: 2017
- Area: 128.15 km^{2} (49.48 sq mi)
- Population (1999): 8,781
  - Density: 68.52/km^{2} (177.5/sq mi)

The communauté de communes Cœur de Caux was created on December 31, 1999, and is located in the Seine-Maritime département of the Normandy region of northern France. In January 2017, it was merged into the communauté de communes de la Côte d'Albâtre

The communauté comprised the following 22 communes:

- Alvimare
- Ancourteville-sur-Héricourt
- Auzouville-Auberbosc
- Bennetot
- Bermonville
- Beuzeville-la-Guérard
- Cleuville
- Cléville
- Cliponville
- Envronville
- Fauville-en-Caux
- Foucart
- Hattenville
- Normanville
- Ricarville
- Rocquefort
- Saint-Pierre-Lavis
- Sainte-Marguerite-sur-Fauville
- Sommesnil
- Thiouville
- Trémauville
- Yébleron

== See also ==
- Communes of the Seine-Maritime department
