= Canton of Fauville-en-Caux =

Coordinates: 49°38′58″N 0°36′24″E

Fauville-en-Caux
- Former canton
- Interactive map of Fauville-en-Caux
- Country: France
- Region: Normandy
- Department: Seine-Maritime
- No. of communes: {{{nbcomm}}}
- Disbanded: 2015
- Area: 111.28 km^{2} (42.97 sq mi)
- Population (2012): 9,152
  - Density: 82.24/km^{2} (213.0/sq mi)

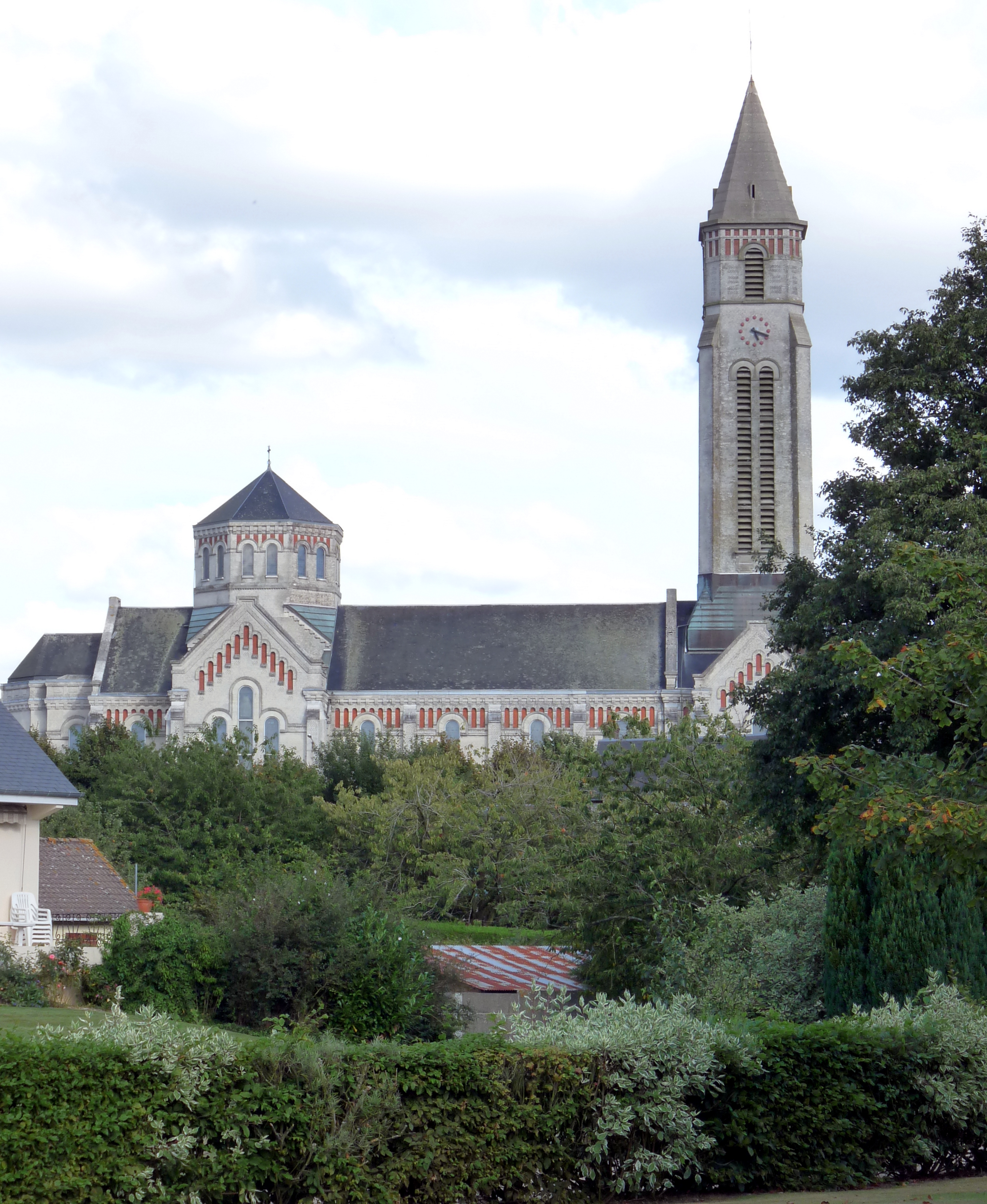
The Church of Notre Dame in Fauville-en-Caux

The Canton of Fauville-en-Caux is a former canton situated in the Seine-Maritime département and in the Haute-Normandie region of northern France. It was disbanded following the French canton reorganisation which came into effect in March 2015. It had a total of 9,152 inhabitants (2012).

== Geography ==
An area of farming, quarrying and light industry in the arrondissement of Le Havre, centred on the village of Fauville-en-Caux. The altitude varies from 70m (Cliponville) to 153m (Alvimare) for an average altitude of 129m.

The canton comprised 18 communes:

- Alvimare
- Auzouville-Auberbosc
- Bennetot
- Bermonville
- Cléville
- Cliponville
- Envronville
- Fauville-en-Caux
- Foucart
- Hattenville
- Hautot-le-Vatois
- Normanville
- Ricarville
- Rocquefort
- Sainte-Marguerite-sur-Fauville
- Saint-Pierre-Lavis
- Trémauville
- Yébleron

== Population ==
Historical population Canton of Fauville-en-Caux
Year	1962	1968	1975	1982	1990	1999
Pop.	5,761	6,173	6,191	6,896	7,602	8,029
±%	—	+7.2%	+0.3%	+11.4%	+10.2%	+5.6%
From the year 1962 on: No double counting – residents of multiple communes (e.g. students and military personnel) are counted only once. Source: INSEE

== See also ==
- Arrondissements of the Seine-Maritime department
- Cantons of the Seine-Maritime department
- Communes of the Seine-Maritime department
