= Armorial of the Communes of Seine-Maritime =

This page lists the armoury (emblazons=graphics and blazons=heraldic descriptions; or coats of arms) of the communes in Seine-Maritime.

== A ==
Image	Name of Commune	French original blazon	English blazon
	Ambrumesnil	D'azur à une croix latine et deux épis de blé passés en sautoir, le tout enfilé dans une couronne, accompagné de trois fleurs de lys, deux aux flancs et une en pointe, le tout d'or	Azure, a Latin cross surmounted by 2 stalks of wheat in saltire, all enfiled of a crown, between in base 3 fleurs de lys Or.
	Amfreville-la-Mi-Voie	Mi parti : au 1) d'azur à l'ancre de marine d'or remplie de sable, avec sa gumène aussi d'or remplie de gueules, au 2) de gueules à la roue d'engrenage d'argent; à la cotice en barre d'or remplie de sinople brochant sur le tout; le tout sommé d'un chef parti au I) de gueules chargé de deux léopards d'or passant l'un sur l'autre et au II) d'or chargé de trois marteaux de gueules ordonnés 2et 1	Azure, an anchor Or voided sable, its hawser Or voided gules, and on a chief gules, in pale 2 leopards Or. impaled with Gules, a gear wheel argent, overall a bendlet sinister Or voided vert, and on a chief Or 3 hammers gules 2 & 1.
	Angerville-l'Orcher	D'or à la quintefeuille de sable surmontée d'un léopard de gueules	Or, a leopard gules and a cinqfoil sable.
	Anglesqueville-l'Esneval	Parti d'azur et de gueules, à un chevron d'or brochant accompagné en chef, à dextre d'une coquille, à senestre d'un lion et en pointe d'un fer de pique, le tout d'argent	Per pale azure and gules, a chevron Or between an escallop, a lion and a spear head argent.
	Anneville-Ambourville	De gueules à la bande ondée d'argent accompagnée de deux annelets d'or, au franc-canton cousu d'azur chargé d'une hache aussi d'argent.	Gules, a bend wavy argent between 2 annulets Or, on a canton overall azure an axe argent.
	Annouville-Vilmesnil	D'azur aux deux épis de blé tigés et feuillés d'or accompagnés en pointe d'une fleur de gentiane tigée et feuillée du même, au chef aussi d'or chargé d'une bande de gueules surchargée de trois besants d'argent.	Azure, 2 stalks of wheat slipped and leaved, in base a Gentian flower slipped and leaved, and on a chief Or, a bend gules charged with 3 plates (argent).
	Argueil	D'azur à la croix alésée d'argent accompagnée de trois fleurs de lys d'or rangées en chef et d'un mont de trois coupeaux du même mouvant de la pointe.	Azure, a cross couped argent between, in chief 3 fleurs de lys and in base a mont of 3 peaks Or.
	Arques-la-Bataille	De gueules au pont de trois arches d'argent posé sur des ondes d'azur mouvant de la pointe, sommé d'un château de deux tours couvertes aussi d'argent.	Gules, 2 towered castle issuant from a 3 arched bridge argent issuant from a base wavy azure (waves).
	Assigny	D'azur à la fasce d'or chargée d'une pomme de pin renversée de gueules accostée de deux maillets du même, accompagnée en chef de deux aigles d'argent et en pointe d'un lion couronné du même.	Azure, on a fess Or between 2 eagles and a crowned lion argent, a pinecone reversed between 2 mallets gules.
	Auberville-la-Manuel	De gueules à la croix d'argent cantonnée, au 1) de la porte du château du lieu, couverte en croupe, flanquée de deux tours couvertes au 2) d'un bouquet de trois épis de blé, au 3) de trois fleurs de lin tigées et feuillés et au 4) d'une vache, le tout d'or.	Gules, a cross argent between 1: the local castle door flanked by 2 towers; 2: a bouquet of 3 wheat stalks; 3: 3 flax flowers slipped and leaved and 4: a cow Or.
	Auberville-la-Renault	D'azur à la fasce ondée d'argent chargée d'une roue de moulin de gueules, accompagnée en chef de deux billettes aussi d'argent et en pointe d'un flanchis d'or.	Azure, on a fess wavy between 2 billets argent and saltire couped Or, a millwheel gules.
	Auffay	Parti : au 1) d'azur au hêtre au naturel, au second de gueules à la crosse épiscopale posée en barre et à l'épée renversée posée en bande brochant sur la crosse en sautoir, le tout d'argent.	Azure, a beech tree proper impaled with Gules, an episcopal crozier and a sword inverted in saltire argent.
	Aumale	D'argent à la fasce d'azur chargée de trois fleurs de lys d'or.	Argent, on a fess azure, 3 fleurs de lys Or.
	Auquemesnil	D'argent à la bande d'azur chargée de trois épi de blé d'or posés à plomb, accompagnée de deux chênes arrachés de sinople à la bordure dentelée de gueules.	Argent, on a bend azure between 2 oaks eradicated vert, 3 stalks of wheat palewise Or.
	Auzebosc	Palé d'or et de gueules de six pièces.	Paly Or and gules
	Auzouville-l'Esneval	Mi-taillé : au 1) palé d'or et d'azur au chef de gueules, au 2) de sinople à la foi d'argent.	Per bend sinister 1: paly Or and azure, a chief gules; 2: Vert, a 'foi' argent.' (a 'foi' is two hands fesswise clasped in friendship.
	Auzouville-sur-Ry	D'argent à la barre d'azur remplie du champ, chargée de la devise « chante et pleure » en lettre de sable, accompagnée, en chef de deux léopards d'azur passant l'un sur l'autre et en pointe, d'une chantepleure du même remplie aussi d'argent.	Argent, a bend sinister azure voided of the field and charged with the motto "chante et pleure" sable, between, in chief 2 leopards azure and in base a water-bouget azure voided of the field. (the charge in base is a 'chantepleure' in French and this is canting arms.)
	Avremesnil	D'argent à la fasce accompagnée en chef de deux merlettes et en pointe d'un lion, le tout de gueules, au chef palé d'or et d'azur.	Argent, a fess between 2 martlets and a lion gules, and a chief paly Or and azure.

== B ==
Image	Name of Commune	French original blazon	English blazon
	Bacqueville-en-Caux	D'or aux trois marteaux de gueules.	Or, 3 hammers gules.
	Bailly-en-Rivière	D'or au lion couronné de gueules, au chef d'azur chargé de trois flanchis du champ.	Or, a lion crowned gules, and on a chief azure 3 saltires couped Or.
	Baons-le-Comte	Parti : au 1) d'azur à la balance d'argent, au 2) de sinople à la navette de tisserand d'or en barre; le tout posé sur une champagne de gueules sommée d'une divise d'or chargé d'une couronne de conte du même ornée de pierreries au naturel. (création : Françoise Mauer-Lemonnier, 2007)	Per pale azure and vert, a balance argent and a (weaver's) shuttle bendwise sinister Or, and on a base gules fimbriated Or a jeweled county coronet proper.
	Barentin	D'azur au viaduc de trois arches et deux demies d'argent maçonné de sable, mouvant des flancs, surmonté de trois abeilles d'or rangées en chef.	Azure, a viaduct argent masonned sable, and in chief 3 bees Or.
	Beauval-en-Caux	D'argent au sautoir d'azur chargé d'un chêne arraché d'or, cantonné, en chef, d'un trèfle et en pointe d'un lion léopardé, à dextre d'une tête d'aigle arrachée contournée à senestre d'une merlette le tout de gueules.	Argent, a saltire Azure charged with an oak eradicated Or, between, in chief a trefoil, in base a lion passant, in dexter an eagle's head contourny erased, and in sinister a French merlette, all Gules.
	Belleville-en-Caux	D'azur au coussinet d'or chapé du même aux deux perdrix de gueules.	Azure chapé, a cushion Or, on each chapé a partridge gules.
	Belleville-sur-Mer	D'azur au sautoir d'argent cantonné de quatre aiglettes du même, la tête contournée. (adopté en 1986)	Azure, a saltire between 4 eagles, heads contourny argent.
	Bennetot	Taillé : au 1) d'or à la crosse d'abbé de gueules senestrée d'une croix de malte de sable, au 2) de sinople aux deux léopards d'or passant d'un sur l'autre.	Per bend sinister, 1: Or, an abbot's crozier gules, and to sinister a Maltese cross sable; 2: vert, 2 leopards Or
	Bermonville	De sinople à la bande échiquetée d'argent et de gueules de deux tires, accompagnée en chef d'un lion léopardé d'argent et en pointe, d'une motte féodale du même, au chef d'or chargé d'une croisette d'azur accostée de deux molettes d'éperon du même. (adopté en 2003)	Vert, a bend chequy argent and gules of 2 traits, between a lion passant and a motte and bailey argent, and on a chief Or, a crosslet between two spur rowels [mullets voided] azure.
	Berneval-le-Grand	D'azur au pal fuselé d'argent et de gueules, cantonné au I et au IV d'une gerbe de blé d'or et au II et III d'une nef aussi d'argent.	Azure, a pale lozengy argent and gules, between, in bend 2 garbs of wheat Or, and in bend sinister 2 ships argent.
	Bertrimont	écartelé :au 1) et au 4) d'azur à la tête de griffon d'or, au 2) et au 3) de gueules à l'épée d'argent sur le tout d'argent au cœur de gueules. (création 2006)	Quarterly 1&4: Azure, a griffon's head Or; 2&3: Gules, a sword argent; overall an inescutcheon Argent, a heart gules.
	Beuzeville-la-Grenier	De sinople à la tour d'argent, aux deux léopards de gueules passant l'un sur l'autre brochant sur le tout.	Vert, a tower argent overall 2 leopards gules.
	Beuzevillette	D'argent à la croix d'azur chargée d'un alérion d'or, cantonnée au I et IV d'un trèfle de gueules et d'une croisette latine péronnée de deux matches brochante du même et au II et III d'une moucheture d'hermine de gueules. (adopté en 2003)	Argent, on a cross between in bend 2 (trefoil surmounted by a cross of Calvary of 2 steps) and in bend sinister 2 ermine spots gules, an alerion Or.
	Bihorel	De gueules à la barre accompagnée en chef d'une ruche et en pointe de deux léopard passant l'un sur l'autre, le tout d'or; au chef d'azur chargé d'un cavalier contourné adextré d'un archer contourné et senestré de deux footballeur contournés, celui de senestre ayant un ballon au pied, le tout aussi d'or.	Gules, a bend sinister between in chief a beehive and in base 2 leopards Or, and on a chief azure a knight contourny between an archer contourny and 2 soccer players contourny the sinister one with a ball at his foot, Or.
	Biville-la-Baignarde	De gueules à la colonne sur son socle d'argent chargé de l'inscription RF en lettre capitales de sable et sommée d'un buste de Marianne du même, chapé d'or au fer de mulet de gueules cloué de sable à dextre et à la molette d'éperon de gueules à senestre; au chef d'azur chargé d'un lion léopardé d'or.	Gules, a column on a pedestal argent charged with the capital letters RF sable and supporting a bust of Marianne argent, chapé Or charged with a horseshoe gules nailed sable and a spur rowel (mullet of 6 pierced) gules; in chief Azure a lion passant Or
	Biville-sur-Mer	D'azur à l'ombre d'église du lieu chargée de deux cygnes affrontés d'argent et posée sur une terrasse de sinople soutenue d'une mer ondée d'azur.	Azure, the outline of the local church surrounding 2 swans respectant argent, all upon a base per fess wavy vert and azure. ('base' and 'sea')
	Blainville-Crevon	D'azur à la croix d'argent cantonnée de vingt croisettes recroisetées du même, ordonnées en sautoir dans chaque canton.	Azure, a cross between 20 cross-crosslets (each group of 5 arranged in saltire) argent.
	Blangy-sur-Bresle	D'argent au lion de sable, armé et lampassé de gueules. (concédé en 1482)	Argent, a lion sable, armed and langued gules.
	Bois-Guillaume	Parti : au premier d'azur à la gerbe de blé d'or, au second de gueules aux deux lions d'or rangés en pal; au filet d'or brochant sur la partition.	Per pale azure and gules, a garb, and in pale 2 lions Or. The line of division is fimbriated Or.
	Bolbec	De gueules aux trois navettes d'argent, au chef cousu d'azur chargé de trois fleurs de lys d'or. (antériorité 1792)	Gules, 3 shuttles argent, on a chief azure 3 fleurs de lys Or. (chief of France)
	Bonsecours	D'or aux trois croisettes de sable à la bordure de gueules. (adopté par délibération du conseil municipal du 18 décembre 1962)	Or, 3 crosses (couped) sable within a bordure gules.
	Boos	De gueules à une tête de crosse d'argent, au chef cousu d'azur chargé de trois fleurs de lys d'or.	Gules, a crozier head argent, a chief of France (azure 3 fleurs de lys Or)
	Bordeaux-Saint-Clair	coupé au 1) d'azur à la maison commune d'argent maçonnée de sable, senestré d'un buste de saint clair aussi d'argent auréolé d'or, au 2) de gueules au vase d'or surmonté d'une croisette du même.	Per fess 1: Azure, the town hall argent masonned sable, to sinister a bust of St. Clair argent haloed Or; 2: Gules, cross couped and a vase Or.
	Bornambusc	De sinople au heaume d'or taré de front, au chef d'argent chargé d'une merlette accostée de deux fleurs de lys, le tout de gueules.	Vert, a helm ??decayed in front?? Or, and on a chief argent a marlet between 2 fleurs de lys gules.
	Bosc-le-Hard	De gueules à l'agneau pascal d'or à la tête contournée nimbée d'argent, tenant avec sa patte senestre une croix à longue hampe du même de laquelle pend une banderole aussi d'or chargée d'une croisette du champ, au chef cousu d'azur. (création : M.Taconet, adoptée par délibération du conseil municipal du 27 janvier 2006)	Gules, a pascal lamb Or haloed argent, holding a long cross from which flies a banner Or charged a cross gules, and a chief azure.
	Bouville	D'azur à l'étai d'or accompagné de trois tours d'argent maçonnées de sable.	Azure, a chevronel Or between 3 towers argent masonned sable.
	Bracquemont	D'argent au chevron de sable accompagné à dextre du chef d'un maillet du même.	Argent, a chevron and in canton a mallet sable.
	Bréauté	D'argent à une quintefeuille de gueules.	Argent, a cinqfoil gules.
	Bretteville-du-Grand-Caux	D'azur à la fasce bretessé d'or, accompagnée de trois roses du même, au chef fuselé d'argent et de gueules.	Azure, a fess brettessed between 3 roses Or, and a chief fusilly argent and gules.
	Brunville	De gueules à la gerbe de blé d'or, au chef ondé cousu d'azur chargé d'un ex-voto de bateau d'argent, accosté de deux pommes de pin aussi d'or.	Gules, a garb of wheat Or, on a chief wavy azure, a boat ?? argent between 2 pine cones Or.
	Buchy	D'azur à la hache d'argent emmanchée d'or plantée dans une souche au naturel, au chef cousu de gueules chargé de trois coins de bûcheron aussi d'argent.	Azure, an ax argent, handled Or, planted in a stump proper, on a chief gules, 3 logger's wedges argent.

== C ==
Image	Name of Commune	French original blazon	English blazon
	Canteleu	D'argent au chevron de gueules accompagné de trois trèfles de sinople. (adopté en 1937)	Argent, a chevron gules between 3 trefoils vert.
	Cany-Barville	Écartelé : au 1) d'argent aux deux gerbes de blé de sinople soutenues d'un pommier du même fruité de gueules, au 2) d'azur au cheval d'argent surmonté d'un mouton du même à senestre, au 3) d'azur au brochet contourné d'argent soutenu d'une anguille contournée du même, au 4) d'argent au versant de colline de sinople, mouvant des flancs, abaissé à dextre, arboré de cinq pièces du même, posé sur une rivière ondée du champ sur une terrasse aussi de sinople.	Quarterly 1: Argent, 2 garbs of wheat vert and an apple tree vert fructed gules; 2: Azure, a horse and in sinister chief a sheep argent; 3: Azure, a pike contourny and an eel contourny argent; 4: Argent, a hill filling most of the field, rising to sinister, with 5 trees at the top, vert, a fess wavy argent 'river'. [Really, quarter 4 is Vert, a fess wavy argent, and a bit of indescribable sky argent.]
	Caudebec-en-Caux	ancien blasonnement: D'azur, aux trois éperlans argent. blasonnement actuelle D'azur aux trois saumons d'argent nageant l'un sur l'autre	formerly: Azure, 3 smelt argent., now: Azure, in pale 3 salmon argent.
	Caudebec-lès-Elbeuf	Parti : au 1) de gueules à la faucille contournée et à la branche de gui d'or posés en sautoir accompagnées en chef d'une lance versée et d'une francisque passées en sautoir brochant sur un bouclier gaulois en bande sommé d'un casque gaulois ailé contourné, le tout aussi d'or, et en pointe d'un dolmen du même chargé de l'inscription en capitales de sable « ESUS »; au 2) d'azur à la louve allaitant Romulus et Remus, le tout d'or posé sur un socle du même chargé de l'inscription en capitales de sable « ROMA » et surmonté d'une enseigne, d'un faisceau de licteur, d'un glaive et d'une trompe passés en barre, bande, pal et fasce, brochant sur un bouclier rond, le tout d'or.	Gules, a sicle reversed and sprig of mistletoe in saltire between (a lance inverted and a throwing axe [francisca] in saltire surmounting a gaulish shield bendwise topped with a winged gaulish helmet contourny) and a dolmen Or charged with the letters ESUS sable impaled with Azure, a she-wolf nursing Romulus and Remus, standing on a pedestal Or charged with the inscription ROMA sable, and in chief a round shield surmounted by (i.e. overall over the shield), a sword palewise, a fasces bendwise, a Aquila bendwise sinister and a trumpet fesswise Or. (An Aquila is a Roman legion's eagle standard; the trumpet is a Roman trumpet 'tuba').
	Cauville-sur-Mer	De gueules aux trois épis de blé tigés et feuillés d'or, posés en pal et rangés en fasce, au chef cousu d'azur comportant en son milieu une dent de scie tournée vers la pointe, chargé de deux mouettes volantes et affrontées d'argent accompagnées de trois étoiles aussi d'or.	Gules, in fess 3 stalks of wheat [palewise] slipped and leaved Or, and on a chief azure with a little triangular bit poking down, 2 seagulls volant respectant argent between 3 mullets of 5 Or.
	Cléon	coupé au 1) d'azur aux trois épis de blé d'or issant d'une roue dentée d'argent, au 2) de gueules à l'épée d'argent garnie d'or, pointe en bas, sur un manteau éployé du même.	Per fess 1: Azure, 3 stalks of wheat Or issuant from a toothed wheel argent; 2: Gules, a sword inverted argent hilted Or, over a mantle displayed Or.
	Clères	D'argent à la bande d'azur diaprée d'or, chargé d'un flamand du même. (adopté par délibération du conseil municipal en avril 1989)	Argent, a bend azure diapered Or, charged with a flamingo Or.
	Cressy	D'argent à la cotice en barre de sinople, au lion à la queue fourchue de sable, armé et lampassé de gueules brochant sur le tout, au chef ondé du même chargé à dextre d'une croisette latine d'or et à senestre d'un léopard du même. (2005)	Argent, a bendlet vert, overall a lion queue forché sable, armed and langued gules, on a chief wavy gules, a Latin cross and a leopard Or.
	Criel-sur-Mer	De gueules à trois canettes d'argent mal ordonnées Quelqu'un dit qu'on emploie Normandie De gueules aux deux léopards d'or, armés et lampassés d'azur, passant l'un sur l'autre	Gules, 3 ducks argent 1 & 2. Someone claimed they used Normandy Gules, 2 leopards Or.
	Criquebeuf-en-Caux	D'azur au chevron d'argent accompagné, en chef de deux maillets d'or et en pointe d'un paon rouant du même.	Azure, a chevron argent between 2 mallets and a peacock in his pride Or.
	Croisy-sur-Andelle	Tiercé en pairle abaissé : au 1) de gueules au léopard d'or, au 2) et au 3) de sinople à l'arbre d'or; au pairle abaissé d'argent brochant sur le tiercé. (antériorité 2003)	Tierced per pall abased: 1: Gules, a leopard Or, 2&3: vert, a tree Or; overall a pall abased argent.

== D ==
Image	Name of Commune	French original blazon	English blazon
	Dancourt	D'azur à la bande d'argent chargée de trois tourteaux de gueules, accompagnée de deux croissants aussi d'argent.	Azure, on a bend between 2 crescents argent, 3 torteaux (gules).
	Darnétal	De gueules à la rivière en fasce ondée d'argent accompagné, en chef de deux roues d'engrenage du même et en pointe d'un tampon d'imprimeur accosté à dextre d'une navette à tisser avec sa bobine passées en sautoir et à senestre d'une navette à drap avec son chardon passés en sautoir, le tout d'or. (attribué par décret impérial du 9 juin 1869, modifié le 28 juillet 1885)	Gules, a fess wavy [river] between two gear wheels argent and, in base, a printers stamp between, to dexter a weaver's shuttle and its bobbin in saltire, and to sinister a ?linen? shuttle with its ?teasel? in saltire Or.
	Derchigny	De sinople à la barre d'argent accompagnée en chef d'un château d'or, et en pointe d'une feuille de caféier du même en barre.	Vert, a bend sinister argent between a castle and in base a coffee leaf bendwise sinister.
	Déville-lès-Rouen	D'azur au manoir normand d'argent maçonné de sable, sur des ondes du champ mouvant de la pointe, à la crosse contournée d'or brochant sur le tout, à l'agneau regardant aussi d'argent, la tête nimbée du même, brochant en chef sur la crosse, au chef cousu de gueules chargé d'une roue dentée de 16 pièces aussi d'or accostée de quatre navettes d'argent en sautoir 2 à 2.	Azure, a Norman manor argent masoned sable overall a crozier Or, over that (and above the manor) a lamb reguardant haloed argent, and a base wavy azure [waves], and on a chief gules, a toothed wheel Or between 2 pairs of shuttles each pair in saltire argent.
	Dieppe	Parti d'azur et de gueules au navire de trois mâts d'argent, voiles ferlées, gréé et pavillonné du même, brochant sur le tout.	Per pale azure and gules, a 3-masted ship sails furled argent.
	Doudeville	D'azur à la barre d'argent, à trois sacs de blé d'or, celui de la pointe brochant sur une faucille du même, au chef cousu de gueules chargé de trois abeilles au naturel. (15 août 1898)	Azure, a bend sinister, overall 3 sacks of wheat, the bottommost covering a sickle Or, and on a chief gules, 3 bees proper.
	Duclair	Coupé : au 1) parti au I d'azur au canard contourné d'argent, en vol, posé en fasce les ailes vers la pointe, au II d'or au pommier feuillé et fruité au naturel, terrassé de sinople, au 2) d'azur aux trois poissons contournés d'argent.	Per fess 1: per pale I: Azure, a duck volant contourny both wings pointing down argent; II: Or, an apple tree fructed proper on a base vert; 2: Azure, 3 fish contourny argent.

== E ==
Image	Name of Commune	French original blazon	English blazon
	Elbeuf	Parti, au premier d'or à la croix patriarcale de gueules, posée sur une terrasse de sinople, supportant une vigne du même fruitée de pourpre, au second d'azur à une ruche d'or, posée sur une terrasse de sinople, entourée d'abeilles sans nombre d'or. (adopté en 1842)	Per pale: 1 Or, a patriarchal cross gules issuant from a base, supporting a grapevine vert fructed purpure, 2 Azure, a beehive Or on a base vert, beset by bees Or.
	Életot	Tranché d'azur et de gueules, à la crosse d'abbé d'or brochant sur la partition, accompagnée en chef d'une coquille et en pointe d'un vase romain, le tout d'argent.	Per bend sinister azure and gules, an abbot's crozier Or bendwise sinister between an escallop and a Roman vase argent.
	Envermeu	De gueules au léopard d'or.	Gules, a leopard Or.
	Épouville	D'or au chevron de gueules chargé d'une fleur de lys du champ, accompagné en chef de deux molettes d'azur et en pointe d'une roue de moulin soudée d'argent, au chef aussi d'azur chargé d'un lézard aussi d'argent.	Or, on a chevron gules between 2 mullets of 6 pierced azure and a millwheel argent, a fleur de lys Or, and on a chief azure a lizard argent.
	Épretot	Écartelé : au 1er d'argent à l'arbre de sinople au 2) et au 3) de gueules plain, au 4) d'argent à la botte de sable;à la barre d'or brochant sur le tout chargée d'une cloche de gueules bataillée d'azur accostée de deux angennes du même.	Quarterly argent and gules, a tree vert and boot sable, overall on a bend sinister a bell gules tongued azure between 2 angennes (roses) azure.
	Esteville	De gueules au chevron accompagné en chef de deux besants et en pointe d'une tête de daim, le tout d'argent, au chef d'or chargé d'un château de gueules accosté de deux trèfles de sinople.	Gules, a chevron between 2 plates and a fallow deer head argent, on a chief Or a castle gules between 2 trefoils vert.
	Étainhus	De gueules au chevron d'or, maçonné de sable, accompagné en chef de deux coquilles du même et en pointe de deux clefs d'argent passées en sautoir, les pannetons en haut, au chef aussi d'or chargé d'un drakkar de sable.	Gules, a chevron Or masoned sable between 2 escallops Or and 2 keys in saltire argent, and on a chief Or a drakkar sable.
	Étretat	De sinople aux deux clefs d'argent passées en sautoir, au chef cousu d'azur chargé de trois coquilles d'or.	Vert, 2 keys in saltire argent, on a chief azure 3 escallops Or.
	Eu	D'argent, au lion passant de gueules.	Argent, a lion passant gules.

== F ==
Image	Name of Commune	French original blazon	English blazon
	Fauville-en-Caux	Parti de gueules et d'argent au cœur aussi d'argent sommé d'un coq issant d'azur avec un panache en forme de croissant versé aussi de gueules, le tout brochant en abîme sur la partition. (antériorité 1976)	Per pale gules and argent, issuant from a heart argent, the head and neck of a cock azure and tail gules. (the heart forms a stylized body for the rooster)
	Fécamp	De sinople aux trois tentes d'argent ouvertes du champ, celle de la pointe plus haute, au chef cousu d'azur chargé d'un faucon essorant, tenant dans ses serres une corne d'abondance, d'où s'échappent des graines brochant sur le champ, le tout d'argent. (adopté le 30 mai 1790)	Vert, 3 tents argent open vert, and on a chief azure, a falcon ?rising? maintaining a cornucopia, from which pours grain over the field, argent.
	La Feuillie	D'azur à la silhouette de village d'argent planté d'arbre de sinople, l'église au centre avec un long clocher accosté à dextre d'une tête de cerf contournée et à senestre d'un casque à nasal, taré de profil, soutenu d'une épée basse, le tout d'argent au chef aussi de sinople soutenu d'un filet d'or.	
	Fongueusemare	D'azur aux deux crosse d'abbé d'argent passées en sautoir, cantonnées en chef d'une gerbe liée de trois épis de blé, aux flancs et en pointe de trois pignons de granges dîmières, le tout d'or.	Azure, two abbot's croziers in saltire, between a garb and 3 gables (from tithing barns) Or
	Fontaine-la-Mallet	Tranché au 1) d'or à trois fermaux de gueules, au 2) de gueules aux deux léopards d'or passants l'un sur l'autre; à la bande ondée d'azur brochant sur la partition et chargée d'épis d'or en pointe.	Per bend Or and gules, on a bend wavy azure between 3 buckles gules and 2 leopards, at the base of the bend, stalks of wheat Or.
	Fontaine-le-Bourg	Écartelé : au 1) de gueules à la mitre d'or, au 2) d'or à l'automobile Delamarre-Deboutteville de sinople, au 3) d'or à la navette de tisserand de sinople posée en bande, au 4) de gueules au lion d'or, le tout dans une bordure componée d'argent et de sable.	Quarterly 1: Gules, a mitre Or; 2: Or a Delmarre-Deboutteville car vert; 3: Or, a weaver's shuttle bendwise vert; 4: gules, a lion Or; all within a bordure compony argent and sable.
	Fontaine-le-Dun	D'azur à l'épée haute d'argent, accostée de deux croissants du même surmontés chacun d'un fer de lance d'or, au chef cousu de gueules chargé d'une crois aussi d'argent.	Azure, a sword between 2 crescents argent above both a lance head Or, and on a chief gules, a cross argent.
	Fontenay	Écartelé :au 1) et au 4) d'argent à la fontaine de deux bassins jaillissante d'azur, au 2) et au 3) d'azur aux deux fasces d'or; à la barre de gueules chargé de trois besants d'or brochant sur le tout.	Quarternly 1&4: Argent, a two-level fountain azure; 2&3: Azure, 2 fesses Or; overall on a bend sinister gules, 3 bezants (Or).
	Forges-les-Eaux	De gueules à la fasce d'or chargée d'une enclume de sable, accompagnée de douze marteaux d'argent posés en fasce et ordonnés 2,2,2 en quinconce, 6 en chef, 6 en pointe.	Gules, on a fess Or between 12 hammers fesswise argent, an anvil sable.
	Franqueville-Saint-Pierre	D'azur au chevron d'or, accompagné en chef de deux coqs affrontés du même et en pointe d'une tour d'argent.	Azure, a chevron between 2 cocks respectant Or, a tower argent.
	Froberville	D'azur au chevron d'argent accompagné en chef de deux têtes de léopard d'or et en pointe d'un roc d'échiquier du même.	Azure, a chevron argent between 2 leopard's heads affronty (erased) and a chess rook Or.

== G ==
Image	Name of Commune	French original blazon	English blazon
	Ganzeville	D'argent au chevron de gueules chargé d'une rose d'or, accompagné en chef de deux losanges d'azur et en pointe d'un alérion aussi de gueules.	Argent, on a chevron gules between 2 lozenges azure and an alerion gules, a rose Or.
	Gerponville	D'or à la bande de gueules fretté d'argent, accompagné en chef d'un lion d'azur et en pointe d'un coq contourné du même au chef d'azur chargé d'une croix potencée d'or accostée de deux billets de banque d'argent.	Or, a bend gules fretty argent, between a lion and a cock contourny, and on a chief azure, a cross potent Or between 2 banknotes argent.
	Gerville	D'argent à la bande d'azur chargée de trois molettes d'or, accompagnée de deux bonnets phrygiens de gueules.	Argent, on a bend azure between 2 phrygian caps gules, 3 mullets (of 6) voided Or.
	Goderville	Palé d'or et d'azur de six pièces, au chef de gueules chargé de trois merlettes d'argent.	Paly Or and azure, on a chief gules, 3 martlets argent.
	Gommerville	D'or à la tour de gueules, ouverte et ajourée du champ, au chef d'azur chargé d'une colombe accosté des lettres G et V capitales, le tout d'argent.	Or, a tower gules opened and pierced of the field, on a chief azure, a dove descending between the capital letters G and V argent.
	Gonfreville-Caillot	D'azur au chevron accompagné en chef de deux cailles affrontées et en pointe d'une tête de griffon arrachée, le tout d'or.	Azure, a chevron between 2 quail respectant and a griffon's head erased Or.
	Gonfreville-l'Orcher	De gueules à la raffinerie soutenue de deux épis de blé, les tiges passées en sautoir, le tout dessiné au trait d'argent.	Gules, the refinery within two stalks of wheat, stems in saltire ??? argent.
	Gournay-en-Bray	De sable au cavalier armé contourné d'argent tenant de sa main dextre une lance du même, accompagné en chef d'une fleur de lys d'or.	Sable, an armed knight contourny maintaining in his right hand a lance argent, and in chief a fleur-de-lys Or.
	Gouy	coupé :au 1) d'argent aux deux clefs de sable passées en sautoir, au 2) d'azur aux trois pains d'or posés en pal et ordonnés 2 et 1.	Per fess argent and azure, 2 keys in saltire sable and 3 baguettes palewise 2 & 1 Or.
	Grainville-Ymauville	D'azur au chevron d'argent accompagné en pointe d'une gerbe de blé de six épis d'or mis en éventail; au chef aussi d'argent chargé de trois roses de gueules tigées et feuillées de sinople.	Azure, a chevron argent and in base 6 stalks of wheat arranged as a fan Or, and on a chief argent, 3 roses gules slipped and leaved vert.
	Grand-Couronne	coupé : au 1) mi parti au I de gueules au léopard d'or et au II d'azur à la couronne d'or, au 2) mi parti au I d'azur à la barque d'or sur trois ondes d'argent, avec une chaîne du même en barre mouvant du flanc dextre et au II de gueules à la roue dentée d'argent mouvant du chef. (création : André Hardy, adoptée par délibération du conseil municipal du 12 juillet 1957)	Per fess gules and azure, a leopard Or and a boat Or on 3 bars wavy argent (waves)Dimidiated with Per fess azure and gules, a crown Or and a demi toothed wheel argent issuant from the line of division.
	Le Grand-Quevilly	De gueules à la fasce cousue de sable chargée d'une coquille accostée de deux croisettes tréflées au pied fiché, le tout d'argent, accompagnée en chef d'un léopard d'or armé et lampassé d'azur, et en pointe d'une queville aussi d'or. (création : Mireille Louis, 1969)	Gules, on a fess sable an escallop between two crosses bottony fitchy argent; all between a leopard Or armed and langued azure and the point of queville Or.
	Les Grandes-Ventes	Écartelé :au 1) et au 4) d'azur à la bande d'argent chargée de cinq losanges de gueules posées et rangées en bande, accompagnée de deux molettes d'éperon d'or, au 2) et au 3) d'argent aux deux fasces de gueules.	Quarterly 1&4: Azure, on a bend argent between 2 spur rowels Or, 5 lozengees gules bendwise; 2&3: Argent, 2 fesses gules.
	Grèges	Parti de gueules et de sinople au bâton écoté d'argent, brochant sur la partition mouvant du chef et le la pointe, accosté de quatre fleurs de lys d'or. (adopté en 1998)	Per pale gules and vert, a pallet ?raguly? argent between 4 fleurs-de-lys Or. (the centre charge might also be blasoned 'a lopped branch palewise', as it is not what English would describe as 'raguly'.
	Grémonville	D'azur au chevron d'argent chargé d'une fleur de lys de gueules soutenue de deux molettes d'éperon du même posées à plomb, accompagné en chef de deux têtes de léopard d'or et en pointe d'un coq du même. (adopté en 2003)	Azure, on a chevron argent between 2 leopard heads affronty and a cock, a fleur-de-lys between 2 spur rowels gules.
	Greny	De sinople au chevron d'argent accompagné en chef de deux gerbes de blé et en pointe d'un arbre, le tout d'or, au chef du même chargé d'un léopard de gueules.	Vert, a chevron argent between 2 garbs and a tree, and on a chief Or a leopard gules.
	Gruchet-le-Valasse	Mi-parti : au 1) de gueules aux trois léopards d'or passant l'un sur l'autre, au 2) d'or à l'aigle bicéphale couronnée d'azur.	Gules, 3 leopards OrDimidiated with Or, a double-headed eagle crowned azure.
	Gruchet-Saint-Siméon	Écartelé :au 1) et au 4) d'azur à la croix alésée d'or, au deuxième d'argent au lion couronné de gueules, au 3) d'argent à l'aigle bicéphale de gueules.	Quarterly azure and argent, in bend 2 crosses couped Or, and in bend sinister a crowned lion and a double-headed eagle gules.
	Gueutteville-les-Grès	De gueules à la crosse d'or et au marteau de carrier du même passés en sautoir, accompagnés en chef et en pointe de deux flanchis et aux flancs de deux cloches le tout d'argent. (2007)	Gules, a crozier and a quarryman's hammer in saltire Or, between in pale 2 saltires couped and in fess 2 bells argent.
	Guilmécourt	Écartelé : au 1) d'argent au maillet de sinople, au 2) et au 3) d'azur étincelé d'or, au lion brochant d'argent, au 4) d'argent à la pomme de pin de sinople.	Quarterly 1: argent, a mallet vert; 2&3 Azure étincelé, a lion argent; 4: argent, a pinecone vert. (étincelé is an obscure semy of 'sparks' often tiny 'stars' as here)

== H ==
Image	Name of Commune	French original blazon	English blazon
	Le Hanouard	De gueules à la bande ondée d'argent chargé de trois roues de moulin de sable, accompagnée, en chef d'un pommier d'or et en pointe, d'un léopard du même armé et lampassé d'azur.	Gules, on a bend wavy argent between an apple tree and a leopard Or armed and langued azure, 3 millwheels sable.
	Harfleur	D'azur sur la mer une nef à trois mats, voiles pliées, des bannières chargées d'une croix, le tout d'argent.	Azure, a 3-masted ship sails furled banners charged with a cross, argent.
	Hattenville	De gueules à la truelle d'argent posée en bande, mantelé du même chargé d'une balance de sable, au chef d'azur chargé d'un lion d'or accosté de deux molettes du même.	Per chevron argent and gules, a balance sable and a trowel bendwise argent, and on a chief azure a lion between 2 pierced mullets Or.
	Hautot-sur-Mer	De sinople au chef d'argent, au lion d'or brochant sur le tout.	Vert, a chief argent, overall a lion Or.
	Hautot-sur-Seine	De gueules au chevron d'or, accompagné en chef de deux épis de blé du même et en pointe d'un trèfle d'argent.	Gules, a chevron between 2 ears of wheat Or and a trefoil argent.
	Le Havre (sous-préfecture)	De gueules à la salamandre d'argent couronnée d'or sur un brasier du même, au chef cousu d'azur chargé de trois fleurs de lys d'or, au franc-canton cousu de sable chargé d'un lion d'or armé et lampassé de gueules.	Gules, a salamandre argent crowned and on flames Or, on a chief azure, 3 fleurs de lys Or, and on a franc-canton sable a lion Or armed and langued gules
	Hermanville	D'argent à la fasce d'azur chargé de trois besants d'or surchargés la 1ere d'un lion contourné, le 2eme d'une aigle bicéphale, le 3eme d'un lion, le tout en tracé, ladite fasce accompagnée de trois roses de gueules, deux en chef et une en pointe.	Argent, a fess azure between 3 roses gules, the fess charged with 3 charged bezants [Or] 1: a lion contourny, 2: a double-headed eagle and 3: a lion all sable voided.
	Hermeville	Écartelé au 1) de gueules au colombier d'or, au 2) d'azur à la colombe essorante contournée d'argent, au 3) d'azur à l'épée haute d'argent garnie d'or, mise en barre, accompagnée en chef d'un heaume aussi d'argent, au 4) de gueules à la gerbe de blé d'or liée de sable.	Quarterly 1: gules, a dove (descending?) Or; 2: Azure, a dove rising contourny argent; 3: Azure, a sword fesswise argent, garnished Or, and in chief a helm argent; and 4: Gules, a garb Or, tied sable.
	Houppeville	D'or à la bande de gueules chargée en chef d'un léopard du champ et en pointe d'une fleur de lys du même, à l'arbre arraché de sinople brochant sur le tout. (1987)	Or, on a bend gules a leopard and a fleur-de-lys of the field, overall a tree eradicated vert.
	La Houssaye-Béranger	D'or à la fasce dentelée de sinople chargé d'un lion d'argent, accompagnée en chef de deux moulins à vent de gueules et en pointe d'une branche de houx aussi de sinople fruitée de trois pièces aussi de gueules posée en fasce. (2007)	Or, on a fess indented vert between 2 windmills gules and a holly branch vert fructed gules, a lion argent.

== I ==
Image	Name of Commune	French original blazon	English blazon
	Incheville	D'azur à la roue à cliquet d'argent, au chef cousu de gueules chargé d'un léopard d'or armé et lampassé d'azur.	Azure, a ratchet wheel argent, on a chief gules a leopard Or, armed and langued azure.
	Intraville	D'or à la fasce de gueules chargée d'une épée d'argent, la pointe à senestre, accompagnée de trois flèches tombantes d'azur.	Or, on a fess gules between 3 arrows point down azure, a sword point to sinister argent.

== J ==
Image	Name of Commune	French original blazon	English blazon
	Jumièges	D'azur à la croix d'or, cantonnée de quatre clefs adossées d'argent.	Azure, a cross Or between 4 keys addorsed argent.

== L ==
Image	Name of Commune	French original blazon	English blazon
	Lammerville	Écartelé au 1) burelé d'argent et de gueules au lion de sable brochant sur le tout, au 2) d'azur aux trois chaussures cousues de sable, au 3) d'argent aux trois marteaux de gueules, au 4) de gueules aux trois têtes d'aigle d'argent.	Quarterly 1: Barry argent and gules, a lion sable; 2: Azure, 3 shoes sable; 3: Argent, 3 hammers gules; and 4: Gules, 3 eagle heads argent.
	Lanquetot	De gueules aux deux gerbes de blé mises en fasce, accompagnées en chef de deux léopards affrontés et en pointe de deux navettes de tisserand passées en sautoir, le tout d'or.	Gules, in fess 2 garbs between 2 leopards respectant and 2 weaver's shuttles in saltire Or.
	Lillebonne	De gueules à deux fasces d'or.	Gules, 2 fesses Or.
	Lintot	D'argent au chevron d'azur chargé d'une merlette d'or, accompagnée en chef de deux léopards de gueules et en pointe d'un aigle aussi d'azur.	Argent, on a chevron azure between 2 leopards gules and an eagle azure, a martlet Or.
	Longueil	Tiercé en fasce : au 1) d'or à deux roses de gueules, au 2) de gueules au croissant d'argent accosté de deux étoiles du même, au 3) d'azur à la rose d'argent.	Tierced per fess 1: Or, 2 roses gules; 2: Gules, a crescent between 2 mullets argent; 3: Azure, a rose argent.
	Longueville-sur-Scie	De gueules au château de trois tours d'argent maçonné de sable, la tour centrale plus grosse et hersée d'or, le tout surmonté à senestre d'un faucon volant aussi de sable. (concession de 1365)	Gules, a triple-towered castle argent masoned sable with a portcullis Or, in sinister chief a falcon volant sable.
	Louvetot	D'azur au chevron d'or accompagné en chef à dextre d'un chêne, à senestre d'une crosse d'abbé et en pointe d'un tumulus mouvant de la pointe, le tout d'argent, au chef du même chargé d'un loup passant de sable.	Azure, a chevron Or between an oaktree, an abbot's crozier and a barrow, and on a chief argent a wolf passant sable.
	Luneray	Écartelé : au 1) de gueules mantelé d'argent, au 2) de gueules au chevron d'or accompagné de trois têtes de loup du même, au 3) d'or aux trois lionceaux de sable, au 4) d'argent aux trois mouchetures d'hermine de sable.	Quarterly 1: Per chevron argent and gules; 2: Gules, a chevron between 3 wolf heads Or; 3: Or, 3 lions sable; 4: Argent, 3 ermine spots sable.

== M ==
Image	Name of Commune	French original blazon	English blazon
	La Mailleraye-sur-Seine	De gueules fretté d'or.	Gules, fretty Or.
	Manéglise	D'azur à l'église du lieu d'or, accompagnée en pointe de trois fermaux du même, ordonnés 2 et 1, chapé de gueules chargé à dextre de deux épis de blé aussi d'or, les tiges passées en sautoir, à senestre de deux léopards du même passant l'un sur l'autre, au chevron en filet d'argent brochant sur la partition.	Azure, the local church between in base 3 buckles Or, and in chief a chapé gules, the dexter one charged with 2 stalks of wheat in saltire, the sinister one with 2 leopards Or, overall a chevronel (??) argent on the line of division.
	Manneville-la-Goupil	D'or au chevron d'azur accompagné en chef de deux fleurs de lys de sinople et en pointe d'un lion de gueules, au chef aussi d'azur chargé d'une renard d'argent accosté de deux coquilles du même.	Or, a chevron azure between 2 fleurs-de-lys vert and a lion gules, on a chief azure a fox between 2 escallops argent.
	Mannevillette	De gueules aux trois épis de blé d'or posés en pal et rangés en fasce, au chef cousu d'azur chargé de trois étoiles aussi d'or.	Gules, in fess 3 stalks of wheat palewise, and on a chief azure 3 mullets (of 5) Or.
	Maromme	Taillé au 1) de gueules à la ruche d'or mouvant du trait de la partition, au 2) d'or aux trois cheminées de gueules de tailles croissantes vers senestre et issantes des quatre toits d'usine du même mouvant de la pointe; le tout sommé d'un chef de sinople chargé de trois abeilles d'or.	Per bend sinister 1: Gules, a beehive Or issuant from the line of partition(?); 2: Or, 3 chimneys issuant from 4 factory roofs gules; and on a chief vert, 3 bees Or.
	Martainville-Épreville	D'argent à la fasce d'azur chargée de trois besants d'or.	Argent, on a fess azure, 3 bezants [Or].
	Martin-Église	Divisé en chevron : au 1) parti d'or et d'azur, au 2) parti d'azur et d'or; au chevron écartelé d'azur et d'or brochant sur la partition; aux trois fers de lance versés, le 1er de sable le 2eme d'argent et le 3eme parti d'argent et de sable.	Per chevron and per pale Or and azure, a chevron counterchanged between 3 lanceheads inverted counterchanged sable and argent.
	Maulévrier-Sainte-Gertrude	Écartelé au 1) d'argent à la tour de sable, ouverte et ajourée du champ, au 2) d'azur au lévrier d'argent colleté de gueules, au 3) d'azur à la fasce ondée d'argent et à la crosse d'or brochant en pal, au 4) d'argent aux trois fers de moulin de gueules.	Quarterly 1: Argent, a tower sable open and pierced of the field; 2: Azure, a greyhound argent, collared gules; 3: Azure, a fess wavy argent, overall a crozier Or palewise; 4: Argent 3 millrinds gules.
	Mauny	D'azur aux trois croissants d'argent mal ordonnés, au chef fuselé d'argent et de gueules. (adopté en 2003)	Azure, 3 crescents argent 1 &2, and a chief fusilly argent and gules.
	Mésangueville	D'or à l'écusson de gueules chargé d'une mésange d'argent, accompagné de quatre carreaux de sable mis en losange.	Or, on an inescutcheon, a tit argent, all between 4 lozenges 1,2,1 sable. (these lozenges are rotated squares) Canting arms (a 'tit' (Parus spp.) is a mésange in French).
	Mesnières-en-Bray	échiqueté d'argent et de sable de cinq tires. (adopté en 1999)	Chequy argent and sable of 5 traits.
	Le Mesnil-Lieubray	Écartelé au 1) de gueules à la grappe de raisin tigée et feuillée d'or, au 2) d'azur à la feuille de scie d'argent, au 3) d'azur aux deux burèles ondées d'argent, au 4) de gueules à la pomme tigée et feuillée d'or; sur le tout d'or à la croix latine losangée de neuf pièces de gueules.	Quarterly 1: Gules, a bunch of grapes slipped and lived Or; 2: Azure, a saw blade argent; 3: Azure, 2 barrulets wavy argent; and 4: Gules, an apple slipped and leaved Or; overall on an inescutcheon Or, a Latin cross of 9 fusils gules. (The saw blade here is a fess indented on the bottom side only)
	Le Mesnil-Réaume	Écartelé au 1) et au 4) de vair à la bordure de gueules, au 2) et au 3) d'or au léopard de gueules.	Quarterly 1&4: Vair, a bordure gules; 2&3: Or, a leopard gules.
	Molagnies	De gueules au lion à la queue léopardée d'or, à la bande d'azur brochant sur le tout, au chef aussi de gueules chargé de trois coquilles d'argent, soutenu d'une fasce haussée aussi d'azur.	Gules, a lion tail raised Or, overall a bend azure, and on a chief gules 3 escallops argent, and ??? a fess azure.
	Monchy-sur-Eu	D'argent au carreau d'orangé chargé d'un carreau du champ surchargé d'un tréfle de sinople, à la bordure du même.	Argent, within a square voided tenné, a trefoil, all within a bordure vert. (tenné may not be a 'proper' tincture but it's the closest that English heraldry has to orange.)
	Mont-Cauvaire	De gueules aux deux fasces ondées abaissées d'argent, au mont de trois coupeaux du même ombrés de sable, mouvant de la pointe brochant sur les fasces, surmonté d'un léopard d'or armé aussi d'argent, lampassé de gueules, tenant une croisette latine aussi de sable en bande. (adopté en 2000)	Gules, 2 fesses wavy abased, with a triple-peaked mount argent over them, in chief a leopard Or armed sable, langued gules, holding a Latin cross bendwise sable.
	Montivilliers	De gueules à l'église d'argent, le portail, à dextre, ouvert du champ, le clocher au centre ajouré aussi du champ et sommé d'une tête de crosse d'or, accosté de deux écussons d'azur aux trois fleurs de lys aussi d'or, ladite église soutenue d'un lézard de sinople en fasce.	Gules, a church argent, the door open, and the bell tower pierced of the field, topped with the head of a crozier Or, between 2 inescutcheons of France, and in base a lizard fesswise vert. (France=Azure, 3 fleurs-de-lys Or)
	Mont-Saint-Aignan	D'or au léopard de gueules accosté de branches de laurier de sinople, les tiges passées en sautoir et liées de gueules; au chef endenté d'azur chargé de trois fleurs de lys et de deux demies d'or. (antériorité 1974)	Or, a leopard gules within a laurel wreath vert, and on a chief indented azure, 3 fleurs de lys and 2 half ones Or.
	Montville	coupé : au 1) d'azur à la roue dentée d'argent accostée de deux navettes de tisserand du même posées en pal, au 2) de gueules à la charrue d'argent; à la divise ondée d'argent brochant sur la partition.	Per fess wavy azure and gules, a barrulet wavy between (in chief) in fess, a toothed wheel between 2 weavers shuttles palewise, and (in base) a plough argent.
	Morgny-la-Pommeraye	D'azur à l'aigle bicéphale au vol abaissé d'or, au chef du même chargé d'un croissant de gueules surmonté d'une étoile du même, accosté, à dextre, d'un cygne marchant de sinople et à senestre, d'un genêt du même.	Azure, a double-headed eagle (??with wings lowered??), and on a chief Or, in pale a mullet of 5 and a crescent gules, between a swan passant and a broom plant vert.

== N ==
Image	Name of Commune	French original blazon	English blazon
	Neufchâtel-en-Bray	D'azur aux trois tours d'argent maçonnées de sable, à la filière aussi d'argent, au chef aussi d'azur chargé de trois fleurs de lys d'or et d'une filière d'argent.	Azure, 3 towers argent masoned sable, and on a chief azure fimbriated argent 3 fleurs de lys Or; the whole shield fimbriated argent.
	Néville	Palé d'or et d'azur au chef de gueules chargé de trois coquilles d'argent.	Paly Or and azure, on a chief gules 3 escallops argent.
	Normanville	D'azur à la croix fourchée d'argent cantonnée de quatre molettes d'or.	Azure, a cross fourchée argent between 4 mullets of 6 points voided Or. (a cross fourchée in English heraldry would have the points splayed out more, but the French and English terms seem to be considered equivalent.)
	Notre-Dame-de-Bondeville	De sable à la bande échiquetée d'argent et de gueules de trois tires, chargé d'un besant aussi d'argent, tangent aux deux bords, surchargé d'un lion couronné de sinople.	Sable, on a bend chequy argent and gules of 3 traits, a plate [argent] (the width of the bend) charged with a crowned lion vert.
	Notre-Dame-de-Gravenchon	Coupé au 1) parti, au I de gueules au léopard d'argent mouvant de la partition, au II d'azur à l'ombre de drakkar mouvant du chef et du flanc voguant sur deux ondes d'argent; au 2) de sinople aux deux épis d'argent, les tiges passées en sautoir, surmontés de trois ombres de ballons de chimie, remplis à moitié aussi d'argent, rangés en fasce, celui du milieu plus grand; aux filets d'argent brochant sur la ligne de partition.	Per fess 1: per pale A: gules, a demi-lion issuant from the per pale line and B: Azure, the outline of a drakkar on waves argent; and 2: Vert, 2 stalks of wheat in saltire argent and in chief 3 chemical flasks outlined, and half full argent, middle one largest; all the lines of division fimbriated.

== O ==
Image	Name of Commune	French original blazon	English blazon
	Octeville-sur-Mer	D'azur au chevron brisé d'argent, accompagné de trois coquilles d'or. (adopté en 1994)	Azure, a chevron fracted argent between 3 escallops Or.
	Offranville	Écartelé : au premier d'or à la croix de gueules accompagnée de seize alérions d'azur, quatre dans chaque canton, au deuxième burelé d'argent et de gueules de dix pièces, au lion de sable couronné d'or brochant sur le tout, au troisième tiercé en fasce d'azur, d'or au demi-cercle alésé d'azur et d'argent aux trois canettes de sable becquées et membrées de gueules, au quatrième de gueules aux deux bâtons écotés d'or passés en sautoir, cantonnés, en chef, d'un croissant d'argent, aux flancs et en pointe, de trois étoiles aussi d'or.	Quarterly 1: Or, a cross gules between 16 alerions azure; 2: Barry argent and gules, a lion sable crowned Or; 3: Tierced per fess a: azure, b: Or, a semi-circle couped azure c: argent, 3 ducks sable beaked and membered gules; 4: Gules, 2 batons raguly in saltire Or between a crescent argent and 3 mullets of 5 Or.
	Oherville	De sinople à la barre ondée d'argent chargée d'une roue de moulin au naturel posée en demi profil dans le sens de la barre, accompagné en chef d'une truite aussi d'argent et en pointe d'une gerbe de blé d'or. (2007)	Vert, on a bend sinister wavy argent between a trout argent and a garb (of wheat) Or, a mill wheel bendwise sinister in trian aspect proper.
	Oissel	Parti au 1) d'argent à la cornue du même remplie à moitié de gueules, au 2) d'azur à la gerbe d'or; sur le tout au chef de gueules chargé d'un léopard d'or armé et lampassé d'azur.	Per pale argent and azure, a half-filled alembic gules and a garb Or, and on a chief gules, a leopard Or, armed and langued azure.
	Orival	D'azur au mont d'argent sommé d'une tour du même, accosté de deux arbres au naturel, le tout posé sur une terrasse aussi d'azur, au chef cousu de gueules chargé d'un léopard d'or.	Azure, a base azure, on which a mount from which issuant a tower argent and 2 trees proper, and on a chief gules a leopard Or.
	Oudalle	D'argent au chevron renversé de sinople, accompagné en chef d'une tête de loup arrachée de sable, au chef d'azur chargé d'un drakkar d'or.	Argent, a chevron inverted vert in chief a wolf head erased sable, and on a chief azure, a drakkar Or.
	Ourville-en-Caux	Écartelé; au 1 de sinople à la rencontre de vache d'argent, au 2 d'argent à un avant-bras dextre en pal portant un flambeau le tout d'azur; au 3 d'argent à la fleur de lin aussi d'azur; au 4 de sinople à la rencontre de mouton d'argent.	Quarterly: 1st, Vert a cow's face Argent; 2nd, Argent a dexter forearm in pale bearing a torch all Azure; 3rd, Argent a flax flower Azure; 4th, Vert a sheep's face Argent.

== P ==
Image	Name of Commune	French original blazon	English blazon
	Pavilly	Écartelé :au 1) d'azur à la croix fleurdelysée d'or au 2) de sable à la crosse contournée d'or, au loup couché d'argent brochant sur le tout au 3) de sable à l'abeille d'argent au 4) palé d'or et d'azur au chef de gueules.	Quarterly 1: Azure, a cross fleurdelysée Or; 2: Sable, a crozier reversed Or, over which a wolf couchant argent; 3: Sable, a bee argent; and 4: paly Or and azure, a chief gules.
	Petit-Couronne	D'azur à l'ancre de marine d'argent, aux deux flambeaux d'or passés en sautoir, brochant sur le tout, surmontés de trois têtes de lion arrachées cousues de gueules, rangées en chef, soutenues d'un filet ondé aussi d'argent. (création : Robert Louis, adoptée par délibération du conseil municipal du 27 juin 1986)	Azure, an anchor argent surmounted by 2 torches in saltire Or, and on a chief wavy azure fimbriatd argent, 3 lions heads erased gules. (created 1986)
	Petiville	D'argent à la bande ondé d'azur chargé d'une épée d'or, accompagné en chef d'un léopard et en pointe d'une fermail contourné, le tout de gueules.	Argent, on a bend wavy azure between a leopard and a buckle reversed gules, a sword Or.
	Préaux	De gueules aux quatre pals d'argent, à l'aigle bicéphale d'or lampassée du champ brochant, les têtes et les pattes d'azur.	Gules, 4 pales argent, overall a double-headed eagle Or, langued of the field, heads and feet azure.

== Q ==
Image	Name of Commune	French original blazon	English blazon
	Quévreville-la-Poterie	Coupé : au 1) de sinople aux trois chèvres couchées d'argent, la 1ere contournée à dextre, la 2eme brochant sur le 1ere au centre en pointe et la 3eme plus petite en chef à senestre, au 2) de gueules au pot à col au naturel.	Per fess vert and gules, 3 goats couchant (1st to dexter contourny, 2nd in center overlapping, 3rd smaller and to sinister chief), and a necked pot proper.
	Quiberville	D'azur aux trois navettes de tisserand d'or surmontées d'un écusson cousu de gueules aux deux léopards aussi d'or armés et lampassés du champ passant l'un sur l'autre.	Azure, 3 (weavers) shuttles Or, and in chief on an inescutcheon gules, 2 leopards Or, armed and langued azure.
	Quincampoix	coupé au 1) d'or au châtaignier de sinople mouvant de la pointe, au 2) d'azur au chevron accompagné, en chef à dextre d'une étoile à senestre d'une roue dentée et, en pointe, d'une fourche et d'une hache passées en sautoir, le tout d'or. (création : Jacques du Bourg, 1977)	Per fess 1: Or, a chestnut tree vert issuant from the line of division and 2: Azure, a chevron between a mullet and a toothed wheel and, in saltire, a pitchfork and an ax Or. (created 1977)

== R ==
Image	Name of Commune	French original blazon	English blazon
	La Remuée	De gueules aux deux épées hautes d'argent passées en sautoir, cantonnées de quatre merlettes d'or.	Gules, 2 swords in saltire argent between 4 martlets Or.
	Ricarville	Écartelé au 1) d'argent aux trois fasces de gueules au 2) d'azur à la tour d'or ouverte du champ et maçonnée de sable, au 3) d'azur à la croix fleurdelysée d'or, au 4) d'argent au chevron de gueules.	Quarterly 1: Argent, 3 fesses gules; 2: Azure, a tower open of the field Or masoned sable; 3: Azure, a cross fleurdelysée Or; 4: Argent, a chevron gules.
	Rieux	D'or à la fasce ondée d'azur chargé d'une épée couchée d'argent, la pointe à senestre, accompagnée en chef d'un lion issant et en pointe d'une rose accostée de deux maillets, le tout de gueules.	Or, on a fess wavy azure between a demi-lion issuant from the fess and, in fess a rose between 2 mallets gules, a sword [fesswise] argent.
	Rocquefort	D'or aux deux marteaux de gueules accompagnés en point d'un lion du même, au chef dentelé d'azur chargé d'une comète d'argent.	Or, 2 hammers and a lion gules, and on a chief indented azure, a comet argent.
	Rolleville	De sinople à la barre ondée d'argent chargée de trois roues de moulin de gueules, accompagnée, en chef d'un pigeonnier aussi d'argent et en pointe d'une gerbe de lin d'or.	Vert, on a bend sinister wavy between a dovecot argent and a garb of flax Or, 3 millwheels gules.
	Rouen (préfecture)	De gueules à l'Agneau Pascal d'argent nimbé d'or, tenant un étendard d'argent chargé d'une croix d'or, sur une croix latine à la hampe du même, le tout surmonté d'un chef d'azur à trois fleurs de lys d'or	Gules, a pascal lamb, haloed and contorny, holding a banner argent charged with a cross Or, and on a chief azure, 3 fleurs de lys Or Note that on the front of the "Grand Poste" (rue Jeanne d'Arc), the banner is charged with a leopard (i.e. the lion passant seen on Norman and English arms). This was the official seal of Rouen at the beginning of the 12th century.
	Royville	Écartelé au 1) d'azur au lion couronné d'argent au 2) d'or à la merlette de gueules, au 3) d'or à la fleur de lys de gueules, au 4) d'azur à la tour d'argent ouverte et ajourée du champ.	Quarterly 1: Azure, a crowned lion argent; 2: Or, a martlet gules; 3: Or, a fleur de lys gules; 4: Azure, a tower argent open and pierced of the field.

== S ==
Image	Name of Commune	French original blazon	English blazon
	Saint-Aignan-sur-Ry	Tiercé en fasce : au 1) de sinople aux deux herses aratoires d'or, au 2) d'argent aux trois croissants d'azur rangés en fasce, au 3) de gueules aux deux feuilles de ginko biloba d'or, les tiges passées en sautoir.	Tierced per fess 1: Vert, 2 harrows Or; 2: Argent, in fess 3 crescents azure; 3: Gules, 2 ginko biloba leaves Or.
	Saint-Antoine-la-Forêt	D'or à la fasce dentelée d'azur chargée d'un lion naissant d'argent, accompagnée en chef de deux angennes de gueules et en pointe d'une croisette ancrée du même.	Or, on a fess indented azure between 2 angennes and a cross moline gules, a demi-lion issuant from the base of the fess argent.
	Saint-Arnoult	D'azur aux trois chicots d'argent posés en fasce et rangés en pal.	Azure, in pale 3 sticks fesswise argent.
	Saint-Aubin-Celloville	Parti : au 1) de gueules à la crosse d'or accostée des lettres S et A capitales du même, au 2) d'azur au clocher du lieu d'argent brochant sur un autre du même plus petit; enté en pointe d'or à la poterie de gueules.	Per pale 1: Gules, a crozier between the letters S and A Or; 2:Azure, the local belltower surmounting another smaller one, argent; on a base ployé Or a pot gules. (the French blazon is 'enté en point' which is basically a triangular base with curved sides. Not really used in English heraldry.)
	Saint-Aubin-de-Crétot	D'argent au chevron d'azur chargé d'une coquilles d'or, accompagné en chef de deux maillets de gueules et en pointe d'une rose du même.	Argent, on a chevron azure between 2 mallets and a rose gules, an escallop Or.
	Saint-Aubin-lès-Elbeuf	Parti : au 1) d'azur au pont de trois arches d'or sommé d'une croix patriarcale du même et posé sur une riviére de sinople, au 2) de gueules à la crosse d'argent accostée des lettre S et A capitales du même; le tout sommé d'un chef d'argent chargé de trois grappes de trois cerises au naturel.	Per pale 1: Azure, a 3-arched bridge topped with a patriarchal cross Or on a base wavy (river) vert; 2: Gules, a crozier between the letters S and A argent; overall on a chief argent, 3 bunches of cherries proper.
	Saint-Aubin-Routot	De sinople à la colombe d'argent tenant en son bec un rameau d'olivier du même, au chef d'or chargé de trois roses de gueules.	Vert, a dove holding in its beak an olive branch argent, and on a chief Or, 3 roses gules.
	Saint-Aubin-sur-Scie	De sinople à la fasce ondée d'argent, accompagnée en chef de deux roues de moulin et en pointe d'une gerbe liée de trois épis de blé et feuillés, le tout d'or.	Vert, a fess wavy argent between 2 mill wheels and a 3 stalks of wheat slipped and leaved, tied, Or.
	Saint-Clair-sur-les-Monts	D'argent à la bande de gueules chargée d'un fermail accosté de deux étoiles, le tout à plomb et d'or, accompagnée, en chef d'une gerbe de blé et en pointe, d'un lion, le tout de sinople.	Argent, on a bend gules between a garb [of wheat] and a lion vert, a buckle between 2 mullets of 5 all palewise Or.
	Saint-Denis-sur-Scie	De gueules au léopard d'or accosté de deux besants d'argent, au chef aussi d'or chargé d'une billette d'azur accostée de deux roses du même pointées de sinople.	Gules, a leopard Or between 2 plates [argent], and on a chief Or a billet between 2 roses azure, barbed vert.
	Saint-Étienne-du-Rouvray	De gueules aux deux léopards affrontés d'or, armés et lampassés d'azur, mouvant des flancs et supportant une roue dentée d'argent soutenus de trois trangles ondées du même, au chef cousu d'azur chargé d'une crosse issante aussi d'or accostée de deux chênes rouvres aussi d'argent.	Gules, 2 leopards respectant Or, armed and langued azure, issuant from the sides of the field, and maintaining a toothed wheel, in base 3 barrulets wavy argent, and on a chief azure a crozier head Or between 2 sessile oaks argent, all issuant from the line of division. (Quercus petraea)
	Saint-Germain-d'Étables	D'or fretté de gueules, à l'écusson brochant d'azur au lion d'argent surmonté de deux coquilles du même.	Or, fretty gules, on an inescutcheon azure a lion and in chief 2 escallops argent.
	Saint-Gilles-de-Crétot	D'azur au senestrochère armé d'argent tenant une lance d'or posée en pal avec une bannière aussi d'argent chargée d'une bande ondée de gueules.	Azure, an armed senestrochere argent holding a lance palewise Or, from which a banner argent a bend wavy gules.
	Saint-Laurent-de-Brèvedent	D'or à la bande ondée d'azur chargée de deux cercles d'or remplis à l'intérieur du premier d'un lion et du second d'une aigle, le tout d'or, accompagnée en chef d'un arbre de sinople et en pointe d'un castor de gueules.	Or, on bend wavy azure between a tree vert and a beaver gules, a lion and an eagle each within an annulet Or.
	Saint-Léger-du-Bourg-Denis	De gueules au chevron accompagné, en chef de deux têtes de léopard et en pointe d'une quenouille posée en barre, le tout d'argent.	Gules, a chevron between 2 leopards heads and a spindle bendwise sinister argent.
	Saint-Maclou-la-Brière	Parti au 1) d'azur aux trois épis de blé tigés et feuillés d'or mal ordonnés, au 2) de gueules à saint Maclou évêque avec sa crosse d'or; le tout sommé d'un chef d'argent chargé de deux léopards de gueules.	Per pale 1: Azure, 3 stalks of wheat slipped and leaved Or 1 and 2; 2: Gules, St. Maclou with his crozier Or; and on a chief argent, 2 leopards gules.
	Saint-Martin-aux-Arbres	De gueules à Saint-Martin équestre partageant son manteau avec un mendiant debout à senestre, le tout d'or, au chef d'argent chargé de trois arbres de sinople.	Gules, St. Martin on horseback dividing his cloak with an upright beggar to sinister Or, and on a chief argent, 3 trees vert.
	Saint-Martin-aux-Buneaux	D'azur à la demi-barre à roue et à la demi-ancre accolées en chef à dextre et au trois épi de blé et au bleuet en bouquet en pointe à senestre, le tout d'or,à la bordure du même, à la barre d'argent chargé d'une crosse de sable brochant sur le tout.	
	Saint-Martin-du-Bec	D'azur au léopard d'or surmonté de deux croisettes du même, au chef fuselé d'argent et de gueules.	Azure, a leopard in chief 2 crosslets Or, a chief fusilly argent and gules. (simple crosses, not cross crosslets)
	Saint-Martin-du-Manoir	Taillé au 1) d'azur à l'épée de saint martin d'or, posée en fasce, supportant le manteau du même, au 2) d'orangé au chêne arraché d'or; à la barre ondée d'argent brochant sur la partition.	Per bend sinister azure and tenné, a bend sinister wavy argent between the sword of St. Martin fesswise holding up a cloak and an oak tree eradicated Or.
	Saint-Martin-du-Vivier	coupé : au 1) d'or à la tige de chêne à un gland et à une feuille de sinople posée en bande et à la tige de houx fruitée de gueules et à une feuille aussi de sinople posée en barre, les deux tiges passées en sautoir, au 2) de gueules à la roue de moulin d'argent mouvant d'une fasce ondée abaissé du même.	Per fess Or and gules, an oak twig with an acorn and leaf vert bendwise and a sprig of holly vert fructed gules bendwise sinister, the two in crossed in saltire, and a mill wheel issuant from a fess abased wavy argent.
	Saint-Martin-en-Campagne	De gueules à l'épée d'argent, chapé du même chargé d'un lion de gueules à dextre et d'un alérion à senestre du même, au chef d'azur chargé d'un goéland au naturel.	Gules, a sword, on a chapé argent a lion and an alerion gules, and on a chief azure, a seagull proper.
	Saint-Martin-le-Gaillard	D'azur à la croix d'argent chargée d'un lion de gueules, cantonnée au 1) et au 4) d'un trèfle d'or et au 2) et au 3) d'une aigle du même.	Azure, on a cross argent between in bend 2 trefoils and in bend sinister 2 eagles Or, a lion gules.
100px	Saint-Nicolas-d'Aliermont	De gueules à la crosse épiscopale d'argent accostée à dextre d'un sablier d'or et à senestre d'une roue dentée de huit rayons du même.	Gules, an episcopal crozier argent between an hourglass and a toothed wheel of 8 spokes Or.
	Saint-Nicolas-de-la-Haie	D'azur au pal d'or chargé d'une crosse d'abbé de gueules, cantonné au 1) et au 4) d'un diamant d'argent et au 2) et 3 ) d'une hure de sanglier du même.	Azure, on a pale Or between in bend 2 diamonds and in bend sinister 2 boars' heads argent, an abbatial crozier gules.
	Saint-Ouen-sous-Bailly	D'or aux deux lions couronnés affrontés de gueules, au chef d'azur chargé d'un alérion d'argent accosté de deux losanges du même.	Or, 2 crowned lions respectant gules, and on a chief azure an alerion between 2 lozenges argent.
	Saint-Pierre-de-Manneville	D'or à la bande ondée d'azur, accompagnée en chef d'une grappe de raisin de gueules, tigée et feuillée de sinople et en pointe d'un sapin arraché du même, au chef de gueules chargé de trois angennes d'argent.	Or, a bend wavy azure between a bunch of grapes gules, slipped and leaved vert, and a fir tree eradicated vert, and on a chief gules, 3 angennes argent.
	Saint-Pierre-en-Val	D'azur aux deux clefs adossées d'or, au chef d'argent chargé d'une pomme de pin de sinople accostée de deux croissants de gueules.	Azure, 2 keys addorsed Or, on a chief argent a pine cone vert between 2 crescents gules.
	Saint-Pierre-lès-Elbeuf	Parti : au 1) de gueules au chêne arraché au naturel, au 2) d'azur aux deux clefs d'or passées en sautoir; le tout sommé d'un chef d'or chargé de trois feuilles de lierre de sinople.	Per pale gules and azure, in fess an oak eradicated proper and 2 keys in saltire Or, and on a chief Or 3 ivy leaves vert.
	Saint-Riquier-en-Rivière	D'or à la bande ondée d'azur chargée d'une rose entre deux coquilles, le tout d'argent posé à plomb et rangé en bande accompagnée en chef d'un arbre arraché de sinople et en pointe d'un maillet de gueules.	Or, a bend azure between a tree eradicated vert and a mallet gules, a rose between 2 escallops all palewise argent.
	Saint-Saëns	D'argent à six tourteaux de gueules ordonnés 3, 2, 1.	Argent, six torteaux (gules) 3, 2, 1
	Saint-Sauveur-d'Émalleville	D'or aux trois marteaux de gueules, au chef dentelé d'azur chargé d'un lion léopardé d'argent.	Or, 3 hammers gules, on a chief indented azure a lion passant argent.
	Saint-Sylvain	D'azur au chevron d'or semé de trèfles de gueules, accompagné, en chef de deux lance d'argent et en pointe d'une tête d'homme du même, au chef aussi d'argent chargé d'un lion de gueules accosté de deux marteaux du même.	Azure, a chevron Or semy of trefoils between 2 lances and a man's head argent, and on a chief argent a lion between 2 hammers gules.
	Saint-Valery-en-Caux	D'azur à deux dauphins adossés d'argent.	Azure, 2 dolphins addorsed argent.
	Saint-Wandrille-Rançon	De sinople au pairle ondé d'argent, accompagné en chef d'une roue de moulin d'or et aux flancs de deux fleurs de lys du même.	Vert, a pall wavy argent between a mill wheel and 2 fleurs-de-lys Or.
	Sainte-Adresse	Écartelé, au premier et au quatrième d'azur à une tour d'argent maçonnée de sable, au deuxième et au troisième de gueules à une coquille d'or, à la croix d'or, chargée en abîme d'un écusson tiercé en pal de sable, or, gueules.	Quarterly, 1 and 4, azure a tower argent masoned sable, 2 and 3 gules an escallop Or; a cross Or surmounted by an inescutcheon tierced in pale sable, Or and gules.
	Sainte-Austreberthe	D'or à sainte austreberthe d'argent habillée au naturel, tenant une crosse de sable de sa main senestre, au loup arrêté de sinople brochant à ses pieds, au chef du même chargé d'une fasce ondée d'argent.	Or, St. Austreberthe argent vested proper, holding a crozier sable in her left hand, a wolf ??? overlying her feet, and on a chief vert a fess wavy argent.
	Sainte-Marguerite-sur-Duclair	D'or au chevron d'azur chargé de cinq annelets du champ, accompagné de trois molettes d'éperon de sable.	Or, on a chevron azure between 3 spur rowels sable, 5 annulets of the field.
	Sainte-Marguerite-sur-Fauville	De gueules au chevronnel d'argent, supporté par deux léopard lionnés affrontés d'or, le tout posé sur une terrasse cousue d'azur chargé d'un poisson aussi d'argent brochant sur une jumelle ondée de sable.	Gules, a chevronnel argent above 2 lions rampant guardant Or, and on a base azure 2 fesses wavy sable, over which a fish argent.
	Sainte-Marguerite-sur-Mer	D'argent à la jumelle ondée d'azur surmontée d'une inscription de deux lignes en lettre du même, « Ste Marguerite » et « sur Mer », au chef ondé de gueules chargé de cinq marguerites tigées et feuillées de deux pièces du champ ordonnées 2 et 3.	Argent, the inscription (in two lines) "Ste. Marguerite/sur Mer" and in base a bar gemel wavy azure, and on a chief wavy gules 5 marguerite daisies slipped and leaved of the field 2 & 3.
	Sandouville	De gueules à la roue dentée d'or, au chef d'argent chargé de trois merlettes de sable.	Gules, a toothed wheel Or, and on a chief argent 3 martlets sable.
	Sassetot-le-Mauconduit	D'or au fer de moulin d'azur, cantonné de quatre croisettes du même, au chef aussi d'azur chargé de deux ancres d'or.	Or, a millrind between 4 crosslets, and on a chief azure 2 anchors Or.
	Senneville-sur-Fécamp	Écartelé au 1) et au 4) échiqueté d'azur et d'or, au 2) d'azur au crabe d'or, au 3) d'azur aux deux épis de blé passés en sautoir; à la croix d'argent brochant sur la partition; sur le tout de gueules à la croix latine au pied perronné d'or.	Quarterly 1&4: Chequy azure and Or; 2: Azur, a crab Or; 3: 2 ears of wheat in saltire Or; a cross argent; overall on an inescutcheon gules, a Latin cross with base Or.
	Sotteville-lès-Rouen	Tranché au 1) d'azur à la ruche d'or accompagnée de sept abeilles du même en orle, au 2) de sinople à la locomotive Budicom d'or; à la cotice d'or chargée d'une cotice de gueules brochant sur la partition; le tout sommé d'un chef de gueules chargé d'un léopard d'or armé et lampassé d'azur.	Per bend 1: Azure, a beehive within 7 bees in orle Or; 2: Vert, a Budicom locomotive Or; a bend gules fimbriated argent, and on a chief gules, a leopard Or armed and langued azure.
	Sotteville-sur-Mer	D'or au lion coupé d'azur et de gueules, lampassé de gueules, les membres d'azur armés de gueules et les membres de gueules armés d'azur.	Or, a lion per fess azure and gules, armed and langued counterchanged.

== T ==
Image	Name of Commune	French original blazon	English blazon
	Tancarville	De gueules, à un écusson d'argent accompagné de huit angemnes d'or en orle ou De gueules à l'écusson d'or chargé d'un chêne de sinople, accompagné de six angennes d'argent ordonnées en orle.	Gules, an escutcheon argent between 8 angennes (roses) in orle.
	Thérouldeville	De sinople à l'église du lieu d'argent de profil, le portail à dextre, au chef parti au I burelé d'argent et de gueules chargé d'un lion brochant de sable, couronné d'or et au II de gueules chargé de deux épées aussi d'or passées en sautoir. (adopté en 1998)	Vert, the local church in profile, door to dexter argent, a chief per pale 1: barry argent and gules, a lion sable crowned Or; and 2: gules, 2 swords in saltire Or.
	Theuville-aux-Maillots	D'argent au chêne arraché de sinople, au chef d'azur chargé de deux épis de blé d'or, les tiges passées en sautoir.	Argent, an oak eradicated vert, and on a chief azure, 2 stalks of wheat in saltire Or.
	Thiétreville	Écartelé : au 1) d'azur au clocher d'argent essoré de sable, au 2) d'or au trèfle de sinople au 3) d'or à la rose de gueules, au 4) d'azur au besant d'argent.	Quarterly 1: Azure, a bell-tower argent roofed sable; 2: Or, a trefoil vert; 3: Or, a rose gules; 4: Azure, a plate [argent].
	Le Tilleul	Palé d'or et d'azur de six pièces, au chef de gueules chargé d'une fleur de tilleul tigée et feuillée d'or, accostée de deux mouettes affrontées du même.	Paly Or and azure, on a chief gules a linden flower slipped and leaved between 2 seagulls respectant Or. Canting arms ('Linden' is tilleul in French).
	Torcy-le-Grand	Burelé de gueules et d'argent au lion à la queue léopardée d'or lampassé aussi de gueules brochant sur le tout.	Barry gules and argent, a lion Or langued gules.
	Torcy-le-Petit	D'azur au chevron d'or accompagné de trois merlettes d'argent.	Azure, a chevron Or between 3 martlets argent.
	Tôtes	Parti : au 1) de gueules aux trois oies d'argent, au 2) coupé en I d'or aux trois marteaux contournés de gueules et en II d'azur aux trois croisettes d'argent; sur le tout d'or au chef d'azur chargé de trois étoiles aussi d'or.	Per pale 1: Gules, 3 geese argent and 2: per fess Or and azure, 3 hammers reversed gules and 3 crosslets argent; overall an inescutcheon Or, on a chief azure, 3 mullets of 5 Or.
	Touffreville-la-Cable	D'or au sautoir de gueules chargé aux extrémités de quatre maillets d'argent, cantonné en chef et en pointe d'une étoile d'azur et aux flancs d'un coq de gueules, celui de dextre contourné.	Or, on a saltire gules between in pale 2 mullets of 5 azure, and in fess 2 cocks gules, the dexter one contourny, 4 mallets argent at the extremities of the saltire.
	Touffreville-la-Corbeline	D'azur aux deux navettes de tisserand d'argent passées en sautoir, accompagnées, en chef, d'un besant, aux flancs, de deux feuilles de chêne et en pointe, d'une gerbe de blé, le tout d'or.	Azure, 2 weavers shuttles in saltire argent between a bezant, 2 oak leaves and a garb [of wheat] Or.
	Tourville-la-Rivière	Coticé d'argent et d'azur de dix pièces, au lion couronné de gueules, accompagné de trois coquilles d'or, le tout brochant.	Bendy argent in azure, a crowned lion gules between 3 escallops Or.
	Le Trait	Taillé d'azur et d'argent au léopard brochant de l'un en l'autre.	Per bend sinister azure and argent, a leopard counterchanged.
	Le Tréport	D'azur aux deux navires de sable, équipés d'argent, pavillonnés de gueules, voguant sur une mer de sinople mouvant de la pointe, quittant la jetée du port d'argent, maçonnée de sable, sur laquelle un guetteur, aussi de sable, tient haut un pavillon de gueules, le tout accompagné au canton senestre du chef d'un croissant contourné d'or adextré d'une étoile du même. (adopté par délibération du 10 juin 1790)	Azure, 2 ships sable, with sails argent, and banners gules, sailing on a base wavy vert [sea], leaving a jetty argent masoned sable, standing on which a watchman sable holding a banner gules; and in sinister canton a mullet [of 5 points] and a decrescent Or.
	Les Trois-Pierres	D'azur à la fasce d'argent chargé de trois épis de blé de sinople, accompagnée en chef d'un soleil d'or accosté de deux mouettes volantes et affrontées d'argent et en pointe de trois pierres du même.	Azure, a fess argent charged with 3 stalks of wheat vert, in chief a sun Or between 2 seagulls volant respectant, and in base 3 stones argent.
	Trouville-Alliquerville	De gueules aux cinq épis de blé d'or mis en éventail, au chef cousu d'azur chargé de trois étoiles d'or.	Gules, a fan of 5 stalks of wheat Or, on a chief azure 3 mullets [of 5] Or.

== V ==
Image	Name of Commune	French original blazon	English blazon
	Val-de-la-Haye	Parti, au 1) mi-parti de gueules aux deux léopards d'or l'un sur l'autre, au 2) d'azur à la barque au naturel mouvant du flanc, sur une mer fascée-ondée de huit pièces d'argent et d'azur, amarrée par une corde aussi d'argent en barre mouvant de la partition et surmontée d'une aigle impériale française d'or empiétant un foudre aussi d'argent; le tout enclos dans une filière d'or à l'épée d'argent garnie au naturel, la garde pommetée d'argent chargé d'un carré en losange d'argent surchargé d'une croix de Malte et le pommeau chargé d'un besant aussi de gueules, brochant sur la partition.	Per pale 1: gules, 2 demi-leopards issuant from the line of division and 2: azure, a boat proper issuant from sinister sailing on a base barry wavy azure and argent, and in chief an imperial French eagle Or grasping a lightning bolt argent; over the per pale line of division, a sword throughout argent garnished proper, the guard has argent blobs at the tips, and is charged with a lozenge argent charged with a Maltese cross; and the pommel is charged with a torteau [gules]; the entire shield fimbriated Or.
	Val-de-Saâne	de gueules à la croix d'or chargée d'un écusson de sinople surchargé d'un coq d'or, cantonnée à chacun des cantons du chef d'une fleur de lys et en pointe à dextre d'une coquille et à senestre d'une rose, le tout d'argent.	Gules, on a cross Or between 2 fleurs-de-lys, an escallop and a rose argent, an inescutcheon vert charged with a cock Or.
	Valliquerville	parti :au 1) reparti émanché d'argent et de gueules, au 2) de sinople au clocher du lieu d'argent mouvant de la pointe.	Per pale highly indented argent and gules impaled with Vert, the local bell-tower argent issuant from base.
	Varengeville-sur-Mer	De gueules à une molette de huit rais d'argent ajourée d'azur, au chef aussi d'argent chargé d'un lion passant du champ.	Gules, a mullet of 8 argent pierced azure, on a chief argent a lion passant gules.
	Varneville-Bretteville	de gueules au lion, accompagné en chef de deux têtes de griffon, le tout d'or.	Gules, a lion, and in chief 2 griffon's heads Or.
	Vattetot-sous-Beaumont	parti d'hermine et de gueules, au mont isolé de trois coupeaux d'argent brochant en pointe, surmonté d'un écusson aussi brochant d'argent chargé d'une croix de sinople.	Per pale ermine and gules, a 3-peaked mount (NOT issuant from base), and in chief on an inescutcheon argent, a cross vert.
	Vatteville-la-Rue	de gueules au navire de trois mâts d'or, au chef d'argent chargé d'une salamandre accostée à dextre d'une feuille de frêne et à senestre d'une feuille de chêne, le tout de sable.	Gules, a 3-masted ship Or, and on a chief argent, a salamandre between an ash leaf and an oak leaf sable.
	La Vaupalière	d'azur à la lettre W capitale d'or.	Azure, the capital letter W Or.
	Veules-les-Roses	de gueules au voilier contourné d'argent, la coque bordée d'or flammé du même, voguant sur une mer d'azur agitée aussi d'argent, de laquelle émerge un filet de sable chargé de poisson aussi d'or hissé à bord du bateau par un marin d'argent habillé et couvert aussi de sable, le tout accosté de deux roses naturelles de gueules, les pétales bordées d'argent, tigées et feuillées de sinople, celle de dextre posée en barre et celle de senestre posée en bande, au chef cousu aussi de gueules chargé de deux bouquets de roses naturelles sans nombre d'or, de gueules et d'argent, tigées et feuillées de sinople, adextrées de deux léopards aussi d'or passant l'un sur l'autre.	
	Veulettes-sur-Mer	D'azur à deux roses d'or rangées en fasce, accompagnées en chef d'un croissant d'argent et en pointe d'un coeur croiseté du même, le tout surmonté d'un lambel aussi d'argent.	Azure, in fess 2 roses Or and in pale a crescent and a heart with a cross on top argent (those 4 charges in a lozenge formation), and in chief a label argent.
	Vieux-Manoir	d'or à l'arbre arraché au naturel, au chef d'azur chargé de deux épées d'or passées en sautoir, accostées de deux besants d'argent.	Or, a tree eradicated proper, on a chief azure, 2 swords in saltire Or between 2 plates [argent].
	Villequier	De gueules, à la croix fleurdelisée d'or chargée en abîme d'une ancre de sable, cantonnée de douze billettes du même.	Gules, on a cross fleury between 12 billets Or, an anchor sable.
	Villers-Écalles	De gueules à la roue de moulin accompagnée en chef de deux abeilles, le tout d'or, à la champagne cousue d'azur chargé de deux poissons d'argent rangés en fasce.	Gules, a millwheel and in chief 2 bees Or, and on a base azure, in fess 2 fish argent.
	Vittefleur	d'argent à l'écusson de gueules chargé d'une molette d'éperon d'or, accompagné de huit fleurs de gueules ordonnées en orle.	Gules, a spur-rowel Or with in a bordure argent charged with 8 flowers gules.

== Y ==
Image	Name of Commune	French original blazon	English blazon
	Yerville	D'azur au pairle d'or, au chef cousu de gueules chargé d'un léopard aussi d'or	Azure, a pall Or, on a chief gules a leopard Or.
	Yport	Tiercé en pairle, au premier d'azur à une nef d'argent, au deuxième d'or à trois peupliers de sinople rangés en bande, au troisième d'or à trois peupliers de sinople rangés en barre, au pairle de sable brochant sur la partition, au chef tiercé en pal, au 1) de gueules à une grenouille contournée d'argent, au 2) burelé d'argent et de gueules, à un lion de sable brochant sur le tout, au 3) de gueules à trois marteaux d'or	Tierced per pall, 1: Azure, a ship argent, 2 &3: Or, 3 poplars vert, all around a pall sable; and a chief tierced per pale: 1: Gules, a frog contourny argent, 2: barry argent and gules, a lion sable, 3: Gules, 3 hammers Or.
	Yquebeuf	De gueules à la croix fleurdelysée d'argent	Gules, a cross fleury argent.
	Yvetot	De gueules à deux gerbes de blé en chef et deux navettes passées en sautoir en pointe, le tout d'or	Gules, 2 garbs (sheaves of wheat) and 2 shuttles crossed in saltire Or.
