= Marius Grout =

French writer and poet (1903–1946)

Marius Grout (born 8 November 1903 Fauville-en-Caux – 1 May 1946 Le Havre) was a French writer and poet.

== Life ==
His father was a postman in St. Saire near Neufchâtel-en-Bray. He chose teaching. In 1932, he joined the Religious Society of Friends.

In the late 1930s, he befriended a group of writers, which included Emile Danoën and his former pupil Pierre Aubery.

In 1937 he published his first book, Kagawa, through the Society of Friends. He won the Prix Goncourt in 1943 for his novel Passage of rights.

He died at Le Havre and was buried in Incheville.

A school is named after him in Rouen, a school in Montivilliers, and the Primary School in Saint-Saire.

== Works ==
- Kagawa, biographie, 1937
- Le Poète et le Saint, essai, 1938
- Le Déluge, théâtre, 1939
- Musique d’Avent, Paris, Gallimard, 1941
- Mysticisme et poésie, Paris, Albin Michel, 1942
- Le vent se lève, Paris, Gallimard, 1942
- Passage de l'homme, Paris, Gallimard, 1943, Gallimard,
- Poèmes, Paris, Gallimard, 1944
- Un Homme perdu, Paris, Gallimard, 1945
- Poèmes à l’inconnue, Paris, Le Seuil, 1945
- À un Jeune Poète, Paris, Éditions du Pavois, 1945
- Kagawa, le Gandhi japonais, Préf. de Toyohiko Kagawa (en), Paris, Presses d’Île-de-France, 1946

== Bibliography ==
- Georges Hirondel, Marius Grout: Prix Goncourt 1943: aventurier de l’absolu, Luneray, Bertout, (ISBN 2867434610)
- Georges Hirondel, Marius Grout : Ecrivain de l’absolu – Essai d'une "revie" littéraire, Thèse à la carte A.N.R.T, (ISBN 978-2-7295-7259-4)
