= Terres-de-Caux =

- Commune
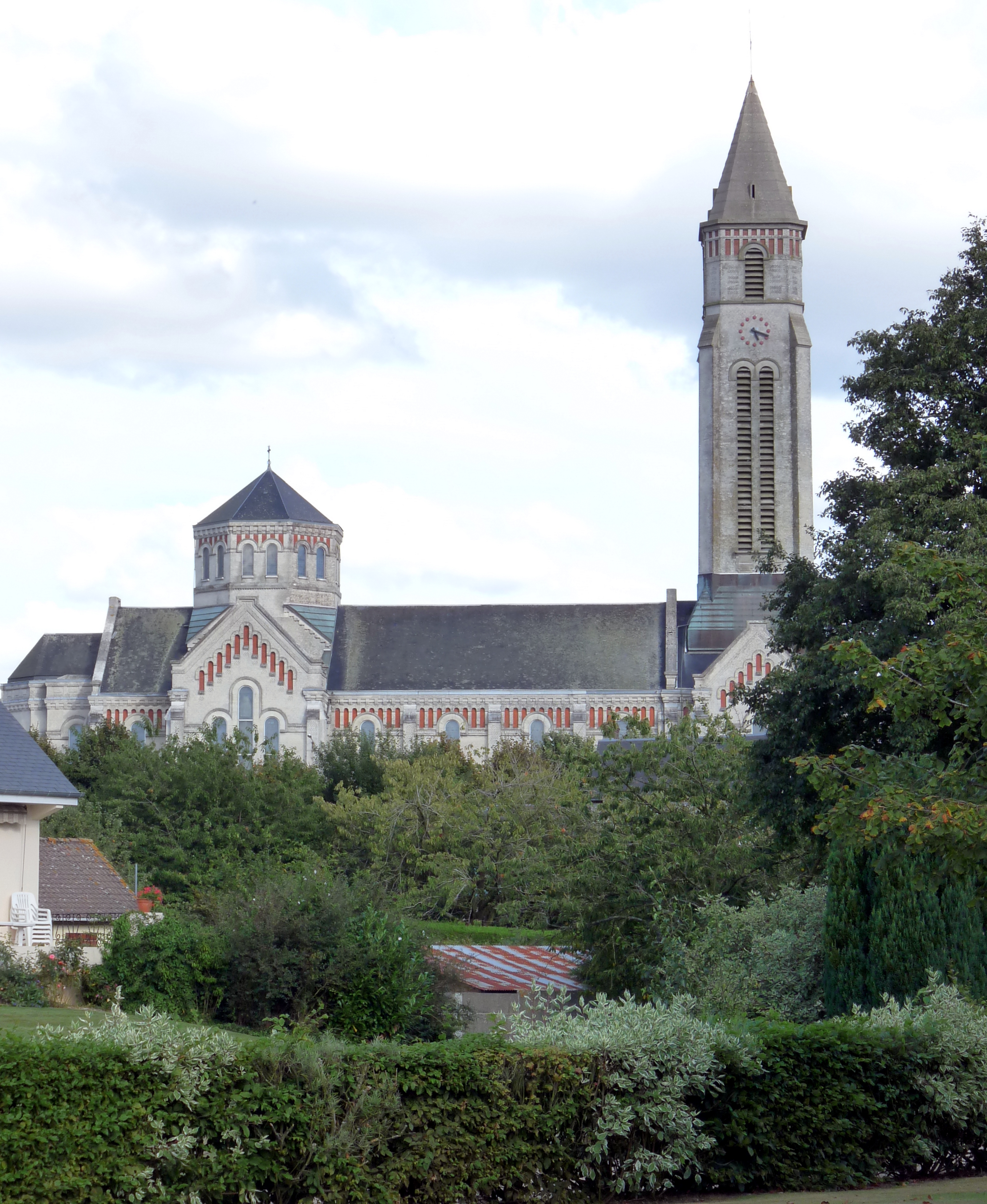
- The church in Fauville-en-Caux
- Location of Terres-de-Caux
- Location within France Location within Normandy
- Coordinates: 49°39′14″N 0°35′31″E
- Country: France
- Region: Normandy
- Department: Seine-Maritime
- Arrondissement: Le Havre
- Canton: Saint-Valery-en-Caux
- Intercommunality: Caux Seine Agglo

Government
  - Mayor (2026–32): Jean-Marc Vasse
- Area^{1}: 38.01 km^{2} (14.68 sq mi)
- Population (2023): 4,245
  - Density: 111.7/km^{2} (289.3/sq mi)
- Time zone: UTC+01:00 (CET)
  - Summer (DST): UTC+02:00 (CEST)
- INSEE/Postal code: 76258 /76640
- ^{1} French Land Register data, which excludes lakes, ponds, glaciers > 1 km^{2} (0.386 sq mi or 247 acres) and river estuaries.

Terres-de-Caux (French pronunciation: [tɛʁ də ko], lit. 'Lands of Caux') is a commune in the department of Seine-Maritime, northern France. The municipality was established on 1 January 2017 by merger of the former communes of Fauville-en-Caux (the seat), Auzouville-Auberbosc, Bennetot, Bermonville, Ricarville, Sainte-Marguerite-sur-Fauville and Saint-Pierre-Lavis.

== Population ==
Population data refer to the area corresponding with the commune as of January 2025.

Historical population
| Year | Pop. | ±% p.a. |
|---|---|---|
| 1968 | 2,540 | — |
| 1975 | 2,733 | +1.05% |
| 1982 | 2,961 | +1.15% |
| 1990 | 3,216 | +1.04% |
| 1999 | 3,391 | +0.59% |
| 2007 | 3,728 | +1.19% |
| 2012 | 4,000 | +1.42% |
| 2017 | 4,142 | +0.70% |
| 2023 | 4,245 | +0.41% |
Source: INSEE

== See also ==
- Communes of the Seine-Maritime department
