= René-Aubert Vertot =

French historian

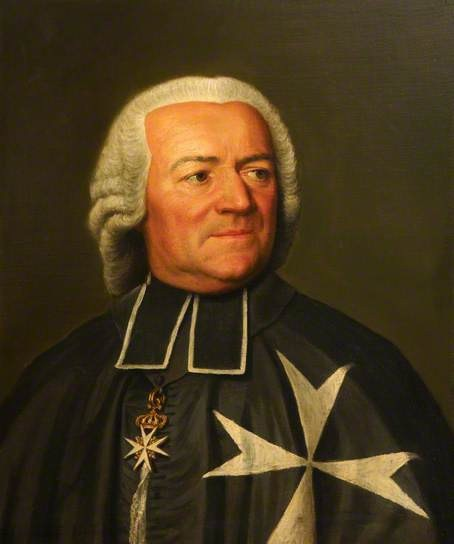
Portrait of the Abbé de Vertot (1727) at the Museum of the Order of St John

René Aubert de Vertot (25 November 1655 in Bennetot, Normandy – 15 June 1735 in Paris) was a French clergyman and historian.

== Life ==
Vertot was for some time a pupil of the Jesuit Fathers seminary at Rouen, which he left at the end of two years to enter the Capuchin Order. His health was greatly impaired by his austerities there, and his family, alarmed, obtained permission for him to join the Premonstratensian Canons. Afterwards he was appointed pastor to several small parishes in Normandy.

In 1703 Vertot was made a member of the Académie des inscriptions.

== Works ==
In 1690, at the suggestion of Fontenelle and the Abbé de Saint-Pierre, Vertot wrote his Histoire de la conjuration de Portugal. The book was received with favour, and in 1695 appeared the Histoire des révolutions de Suède (History of the Swedish revolutions). Besides contributions to the Mémoires of the Académie and other minor works, he wrote the Révolutions romains (1719) and Histoire des chevaliers hospitaliers de Saint-Jean de Jérusalem (History of the Knights Hospitallers), also known as Histoire de Malte (History of Malta).

It is related that in answer to an offer of additional data about the great siege by the Ottomans in 1565, he said, "Mon siège est fait" ("My siege is finished"), a phrase construed by some of his critics as an expression of his disregard for historical accuracy. Another interpretation of the comment is that he wished to get rid of an intruder who was trying to force upon him documents whose authenticity was doubtful.

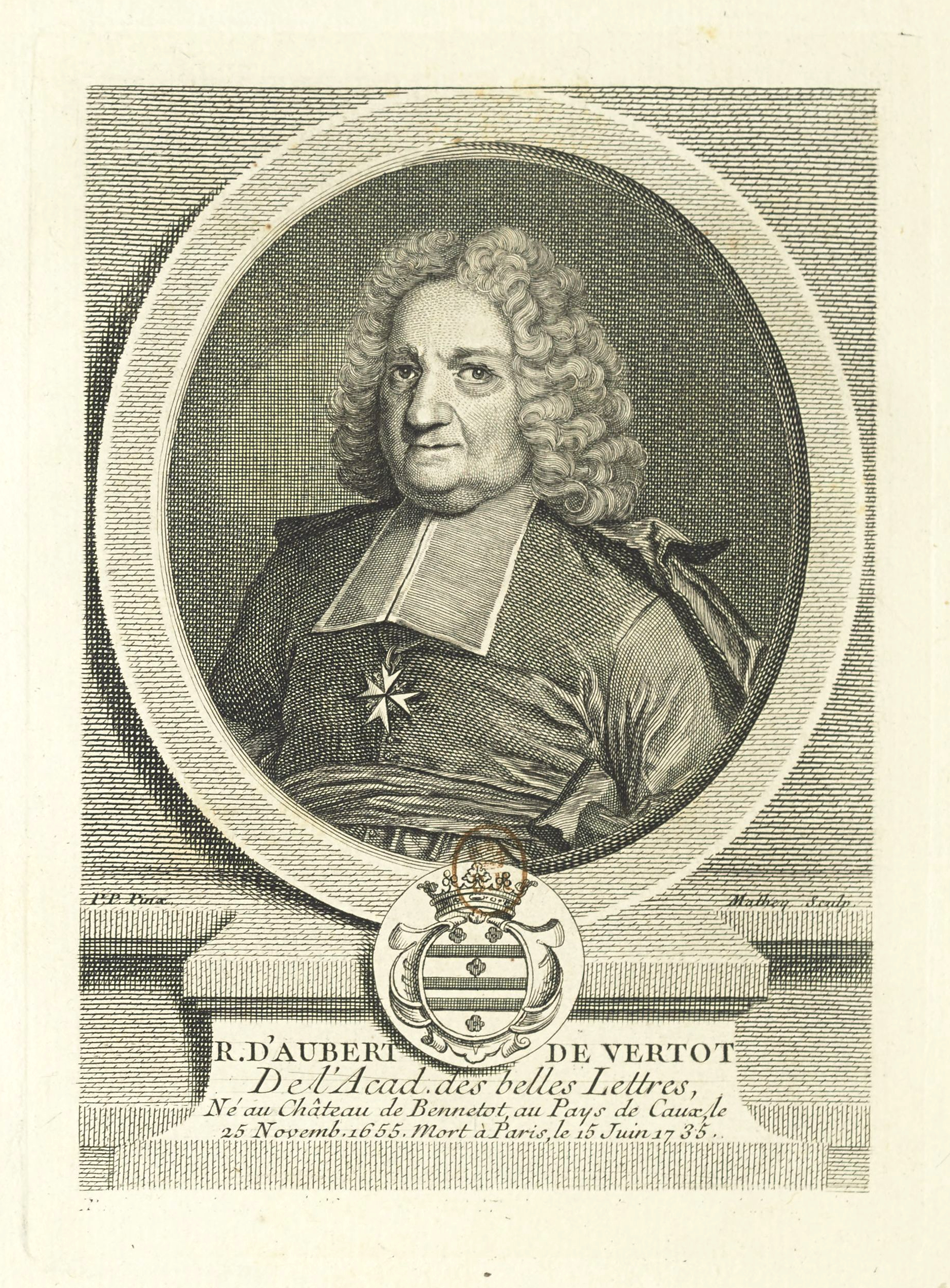
Engraving of de Vertot from 1787

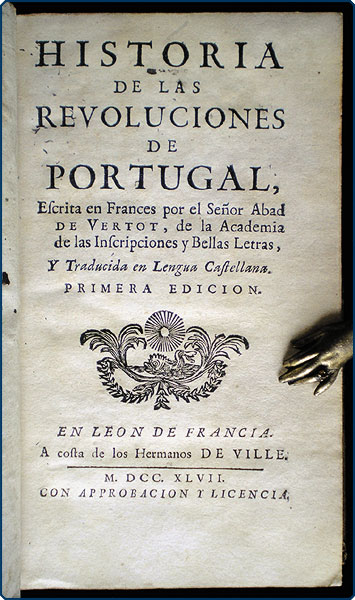
A Spanish 1747 edition of Vertot's History of the Revolutions in Portugal
