= Saint-Aignan-sur-Ry =

- Commune
- Coat of arms
- Location of Saint-Aignan-sur-Ry
- Location within France Location within Normandy
- Coordinates: 49°30′12″N 1°21′14″E
- Country: France
- Region: Normandy
- Department: Seine-Maritime
- Arrondissement: Rouen
- Canton: Le Mesnil-Esnard

Government
  - Mayor (2020–2026): Jean-Pierre Carpentier
- Area^{1}: 8 km^{2} (3.1 sq mi)
- Elevation: 135 m (443 ft)
- Highest elevation: 161 m (528 ft)
- Lowest elevation: 80 m (260 ft)
- Population (2023): 341
  - Density: 43/km^{2} (110/sq mi)
- Time zone: UTC+01:00 (CET)
  - Summer (DST): UTC+02:00 (CEST)
- INSEE/Postal code: 76554 /76116
- ^{1} French Land Register data, which excludes lakes, ponds, glaciers > 1 km^{2} (0.386 sq mi or 247 acres) and river estuaries.

Saint-Aignan-sur-Ry (French pronunciation: [sɛ̃t‿ɛɲɑ̃ syʁ ʁi], literally Saint-Aignan on Ry) is a commune in the Seine-Maritime department in the Normandy region in northern France.

== Geography ==
A small village northeast of Rouen on the D93 road, and borders on the southwest the bank of the river Crevon 14 miles (23 km).

== Heraldry ==
Arms of Saint-Aignan-sur-Ry	The arms of Saint-Aignan-sur-Ry are blazoned : Tierced per fess 1: Vert, 2 harrows Or; 2: Argent, in fess 3 crescents azure; 3: Gules, 2 ginko biloba leaves Or.

== Population ==
Historical population
Year	Pop.	±% p.a.
1968	162	—
1975	178	+1.35%
1982	200	+1.68%
1990	265	+3.58%
1999	281	+0.65%
2007	294	+0.57%
2012	316	+1.45%
2017	348	+1.95%
2023	341	−0.34%
Source: INSEE

== Places of interest ==
- The church of St. Aignan, dating from the twelfth century.

== See also ==
- Communes of the Seine-Maritime department
