= Saint-Pierre-Lavis =

- Part of Terres-de-Caux
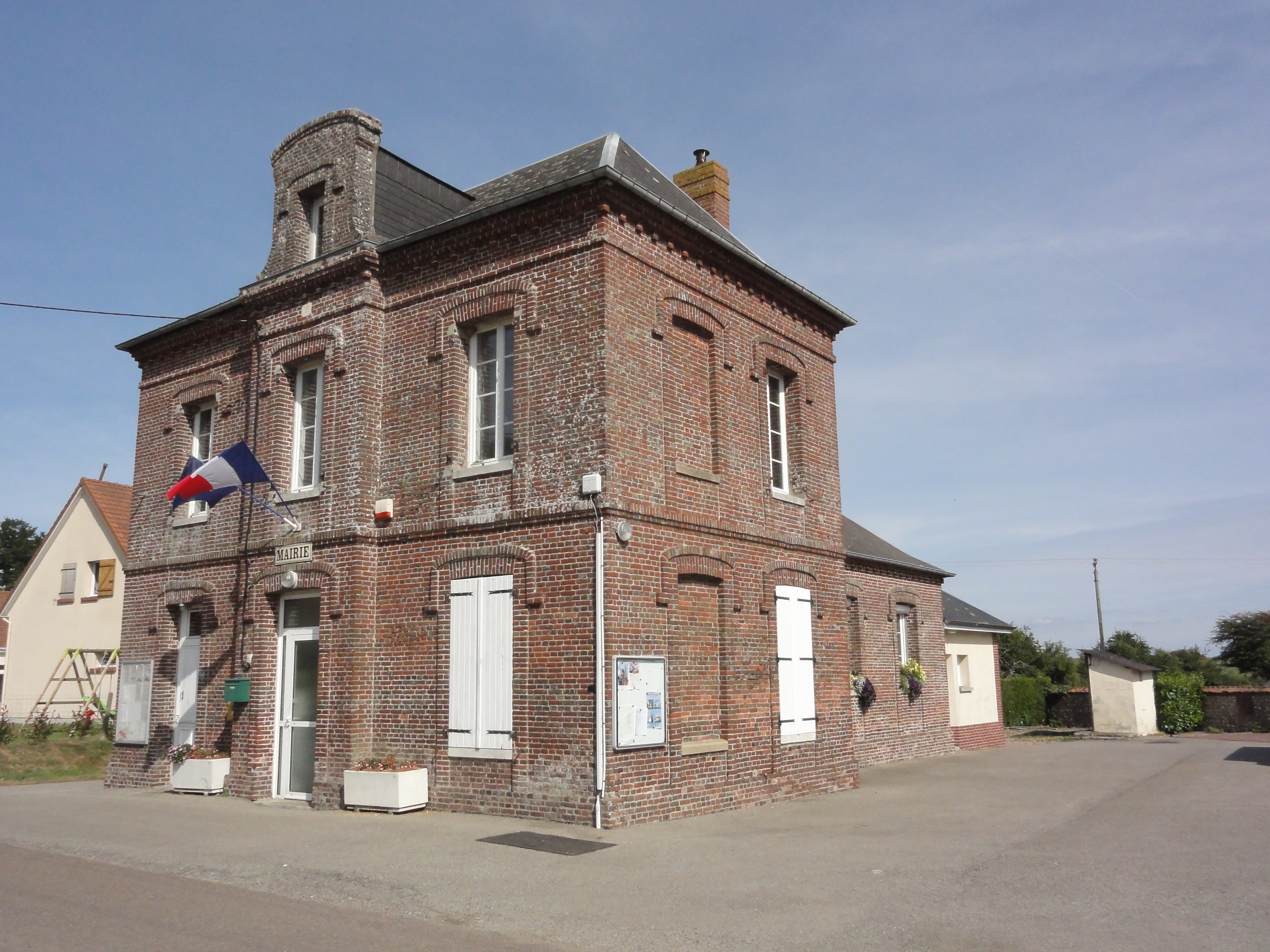
- Town hall
- Location of Saint-Pierre-Lavis
- Location within France Location within Normandy
- Coordinates: 49°39′35″N 0°37′46″E
- Country: France
- Region: Normandy
- Department: Seine-Maritime
- Arrondissement: Le Havre
- Canton: Saint-Valery-en-Caux
- Commune: Terres-de-Caux
- Area^{1}: 4.49 km^{2} (1.73 sq mi)
- Elevation: 135 m (443 ft)
- Highest elevation: 144 m (472 ft)
- Lowest elevation: 128 m (420 ft)
- Population (2022): 309
  - Density: 68.8/km^{2} (178/sq mi)
- Time zone: UTC+01:00 (CET)
  - Summer (DST): UTC+02:00 (CEST)
- Postal code: 76640
- ^{1} French Land Register data, which excludes lakes, ponds, glaciers > 1 km^{2} (0.386 sq mi or 247 acres) and river estuaries.

Saint-Pierre-Lavis is a former commune in the Seine-Maritime department in the Normandy region in northern France. On 1 January 2017, it was merged into the new commune Terres-de-Caux.

== Geography ==
A very small farming village in the Pays de Caux, situated some 30 miles (48 km) northeast of Le Havre, at the junction of the D33, D228 and D149 roads.

== Population ==
Historical population
Year	Pop.	±% p.a.
1962	136	—
1968	101	−4.84%
1975	95	−0.87%
1982	118	+3.15%
1990	123	+0.52%
1999	128	+0.44%
2006	152	+2.49%
2013	242	+6.87%
2022	309	+2.75%
Source: EHESS and INSEE

== Places of interest ==
- The church of St.Pierre, dating from the twelfth century.
- The twenty-first-century war memorial.

== See also ==
- Communes of the Seine-Maritime department
