= Trémauville =

- Commune
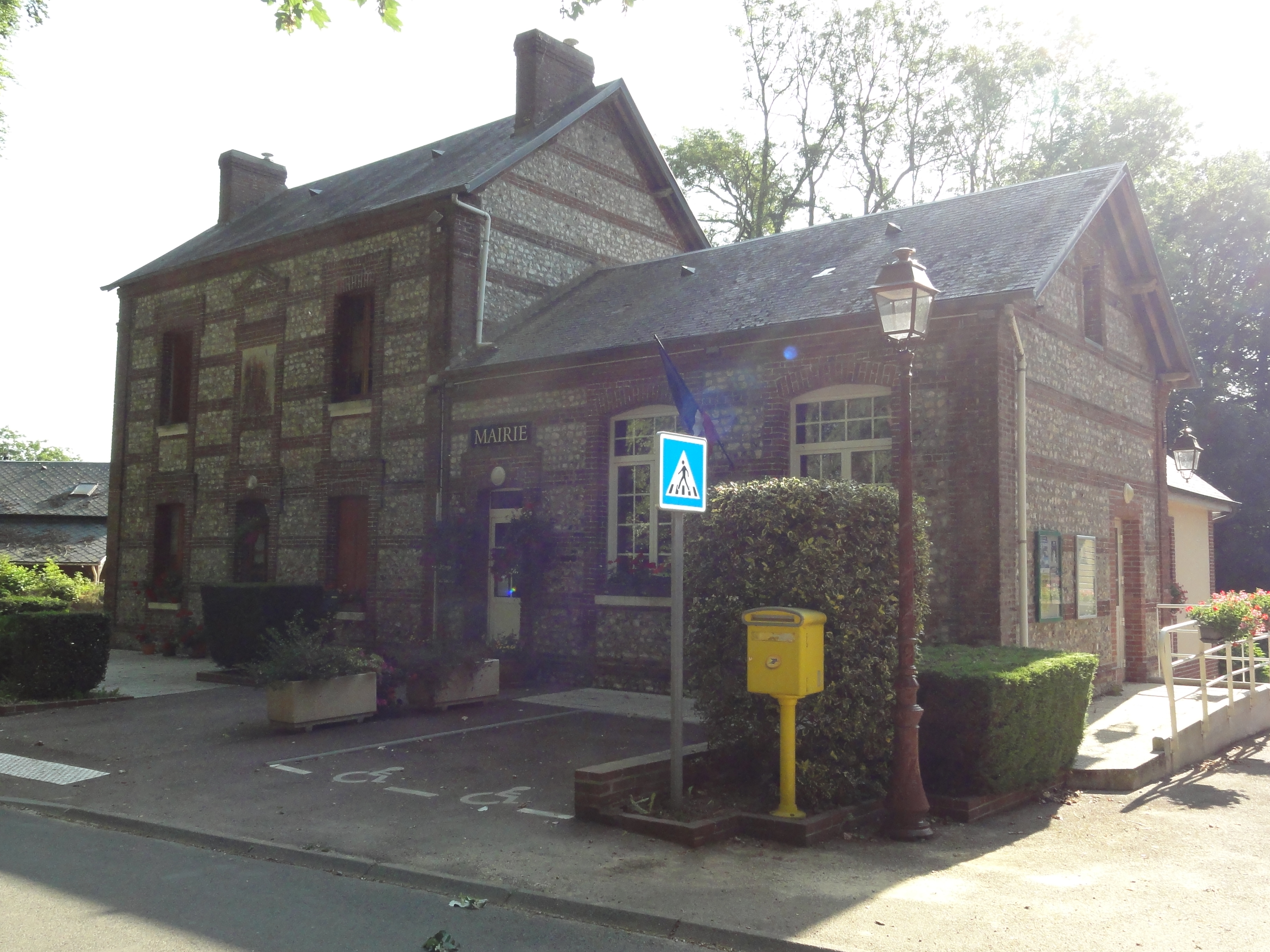
- Trémauville Town hall
- Location of Trémauville
- Location within France Location within Normandy
- Coordinates: 49°39′58″N 0°31′21″E
- Country: France
- Region: Normandy
- Department: Seine-Maritime
- Arrondissement: Le Havre
- Canton: Saint-Valery-en-Caux
- Intercommunality: Caux Seine Agglo

Government
  - Mayor (2026–32): Frédérick Denize
- Area^{1}: 2.8 km^{2} (1.1 sq mi)
- Elevation: 125 m (410 ft)
- Highest elevation: 139 m (456 ft)
- Lowest elevation: 118 m (387 ft)
- Population (2023): 102
  - Density: 36/km^{2} (94/sq mi)
- Time zone: UTC+01:00 (CET)
  - Summer (DST): UTC+02:00 (CEST)
- INSEE/Postal code: 76710 /76640
- ^{1} French Land Register data, which excludes lakes, ponds, glaciers > 1 km^{2} (0.386 sq mi or 247 acres) and river estuaries.

Trémauville (French pronunciation: [tʁemovil]) is a commune in the Seine-Maritime department in the Normandy region in northern France.

== Geography ==
A very small farming village in the Pays de Caux, situated some 22 miles (35 km) east of Le Havre, in between the D17 and D217 roads.

== Population ==
Historical population
Year	Pop.	±% p.a.
1968	82	—
1975	82	+0.00%
1982	96	+2.28%
1990	98	+0.26%
1999	89	−1.06%
2007	94	+0.69%
2012	100	+1.25%
2017	106	+1.17%
2023	102	−0.64%
Source: INSEE

== Places of interest ==
- The church of St. Riquier dating from the seventeenth century.
- The seventeenth-century stone cross.

== See also ==
- Communes of the Seine-Maritime department
