= Auzouville-Auberbosc =

- Part of Terres-de-Caux
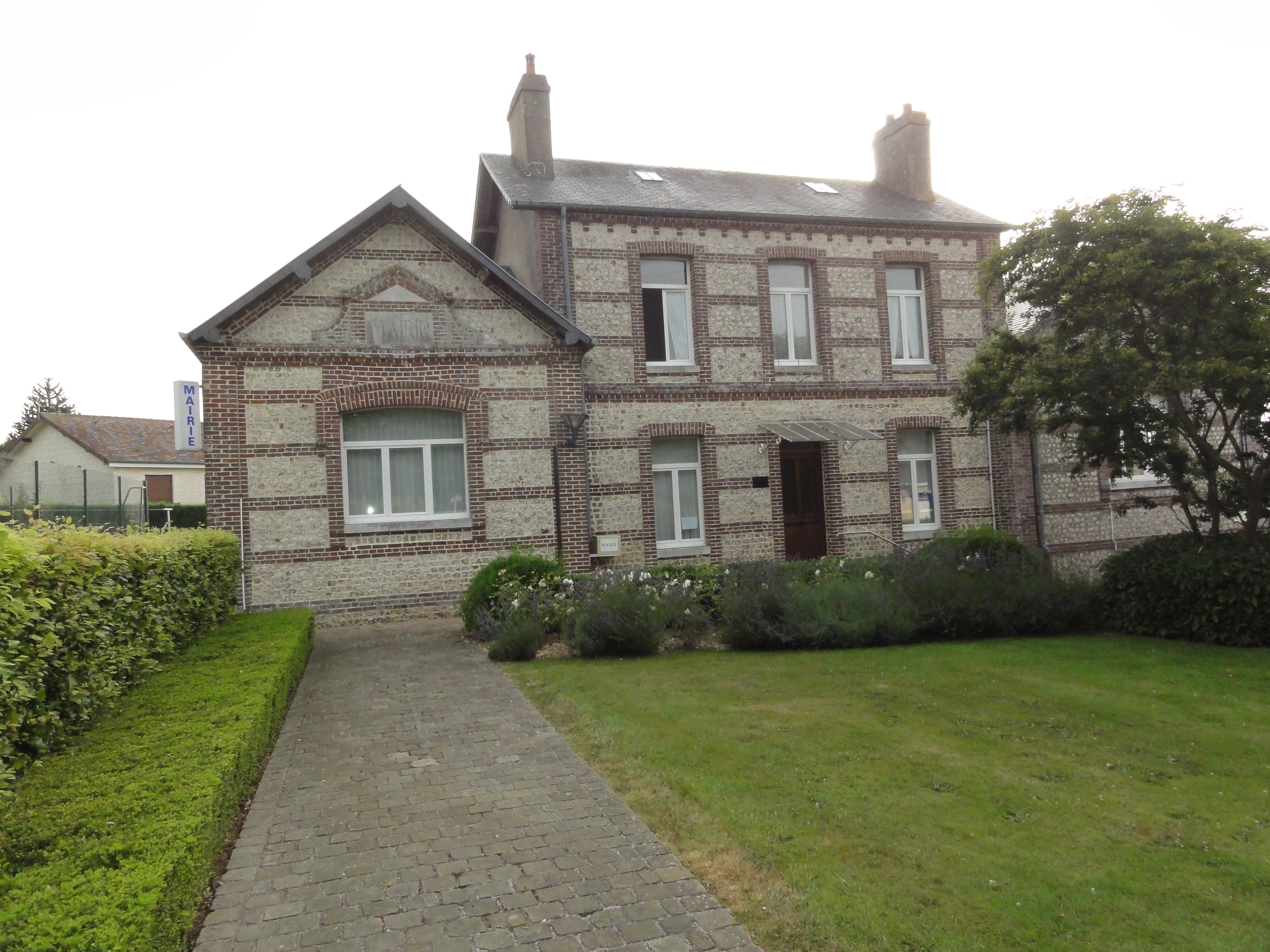
- The Town hall of Auzouville-Auberbosc
- Location of Auzouville-Auberbosc
- Location within France Location within Normandy
- Coordinates: 49°37′38″N 0°34′14″E
- Country: France
- Region: Normandy
- Department: Seine-Maritime
- Arrondissement: Le Havre
- Canton: Saint-Valery-en-Caux
- Commune: Terres-de-Caux
- Area^{1}: 6.08 km^{2} (2.35 sq mi)
- Elevation: 140 m (460 ft)
- Highest elevation: 149 m (489 ft)
- Lowest elevation: 121 m (397 ft)
- Population (2023): 307
  - Density: 50.5/km^{2} (131/sq mi)
- Time zone: UTC+01:00 (CET)
  - Summer (DST): UTC+02:00 (CEST)
- Postal code: 76640
- Website: auzouville-auberbosc.terres-de-caux.fr
- ^{1} French Land Register data, which excludes lakes, ponds, glaciers > 1 km^{2} (0.386 sq mi or 247 acres) and river estuaries.

Auzouville-Auberbosc is a former commune in the Seine-Maritime department in the Normandy region in northern France. On 1 January 2017, it was merged into the new commune Terres-de-Caux.

== Geography ==
A farming village situated in the Pays de Caux, some 21 miles (34 km) northeast of Le Havre, at the junction of the D109 and the D104. The A29 autoroute passes by in the southern part of the commune.

== Places of interest ==
- The church of St.Leger at Auzouville, dating from the sixteenth century.
- The church of St.Leger at Auberbosc, dating from the eleventh century.
- A medieval manorhouse.

== See also ==
- Communes of the Seine-Maritime department
