= Sainte-Marguerite-sur-Fauville =

- Part of Terres-de-Caux
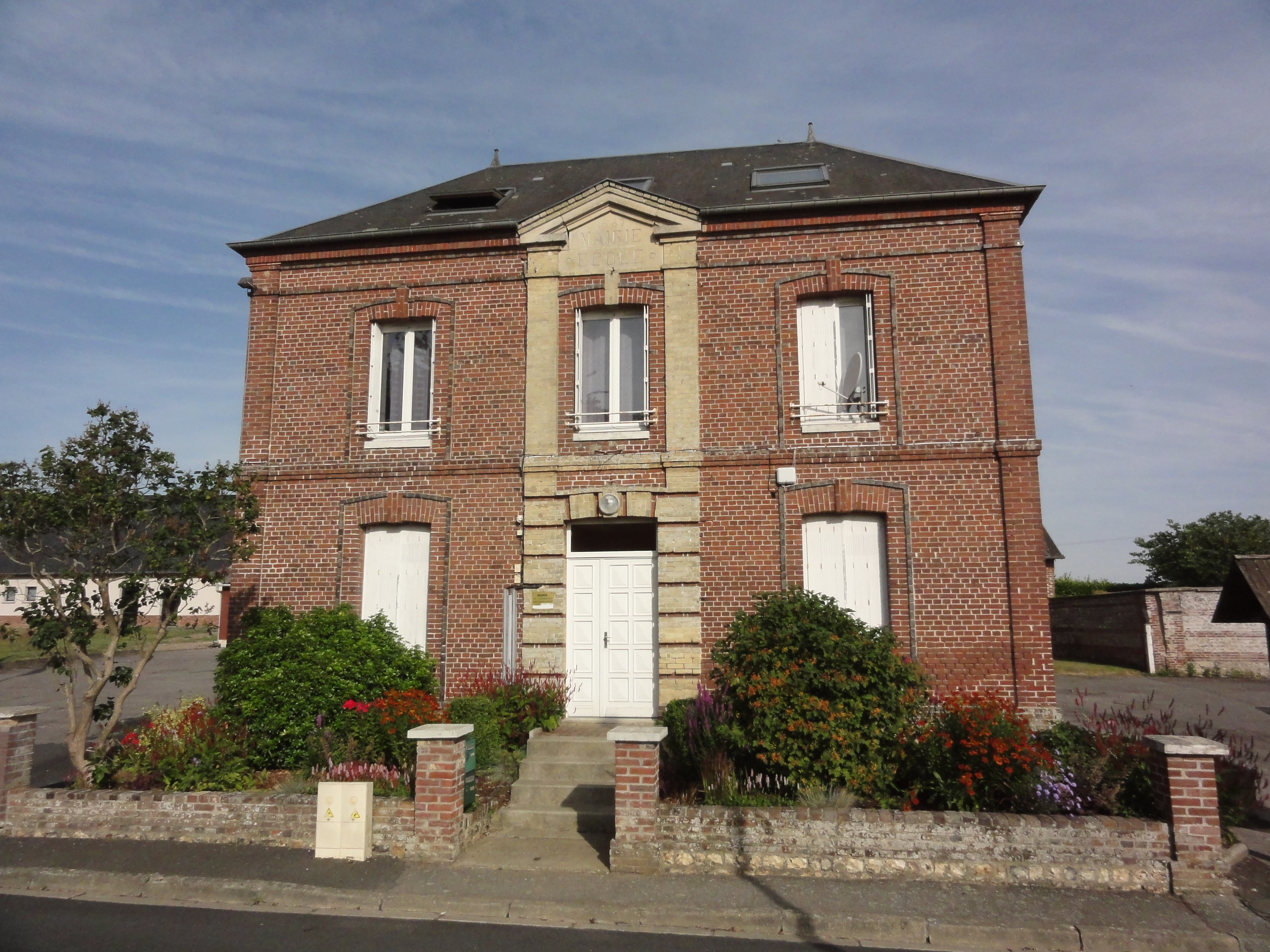
- Town hall

- Coat of arms
- Location of Sainte-Marguerite-sur-Fauville
- Location within France Location within Normandy
- Coordinates: 49°40′12″N 0°36′12″E
- Country: France
- Region: Normandy
- Department: Seine-Maritime
- Arrondissement: Le Havre
- Canton: Saint-Valery-en-Caux
- Commune: Terres-de-Caux
- Area^{1}: 3.16 km^{2} (1.22 sq mi)
- Elevation: 130 m (430 ft)
- Highest elevation: 139 m (456 ft)
- Lowest elevation: 114 m (374 ft)
- Population (2023): 286
  - Density: 90.5/km^{2} (234/sq mi)
- Time zone: UTC+01:00 (CET)
  - Summer (DST): UTC+02:00 (CEST)
- Postal code: 76640
- ^{1} French Land Register data, which excludes lakes, ponds, glaciers > 1 km^{2} (0.386 sq mi or 247 acres) and river estuaries.

Sainte-Marguerite-sur-Fauville (French pronunciation: [sɛ̃t maʁɡəʁit syʁ fovil], lit. 'Sainte-Marguerite on Fauville') is a former commune in the Seine-Maritime département in the Normandy region in northern France. On 1 January 2017, it was merged into the new commune Terres-de-Caux.

Inhabitants are called Sainte-Margueritais (male) or Sainte-Margueritaises (female).

== Geography ==
A small farming village, in the Pays de Caux, situated 27 miles (43 km) northeast of Le Havre, to the north of the junction of the D109 and D50 roads.

== Coat of arms ==
Arms of Sainte-Marguerite-sur-Fauville	The arms of Sainte-Marguerite-sur-Fauville are blazoned : Gules, a chevronnel argent above 2 lions rampant guardant Or, and on a base azure 2 fesses wavy sable, over which a fish argent.

== Population ==
Historical population
Year	Pop.	±% p.a.
1962	199	—
1968	165	−3.07%
1975	225	+4.53%
1982	194	−2.10%
1990	246	+3.01%
1999	264	+0.79%
2023	286	+0.33%
Source: EHESS and INSEE (2023)

== Places of interest ==
- A sandstone cross.
- The church of St.Marguerite, dating from the seventeenth century.

== See also ==
- Communes of the Seine-Maritime department
