= Envronville =

- Commune
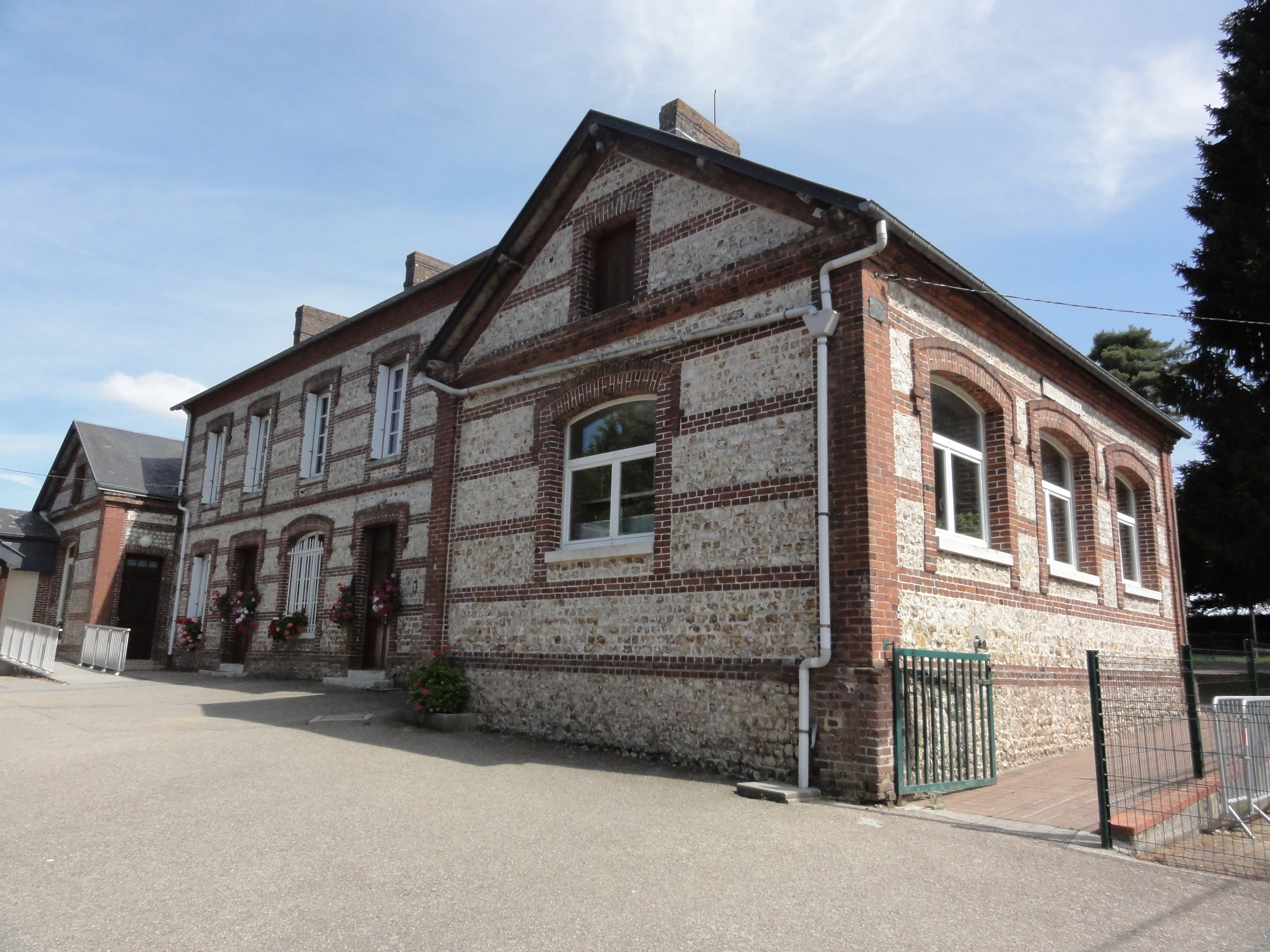
- Envronville Town hall
- Location of Envronville
- Location within France Location within Normandy
- Coordinates: 49°39′45″N 0°40′14″E
- Country: France
- Region: Normandy
- Department: Seine-Maritime
- Arrondissement: Le Havre
- Canton: Saint-Valery-en-Caux
- Intercommunality: Caux Seine Agglo

Government
  - Mayor (2020–2026): François Truptil
- Area^{1}: 6.22 km^{2} (2.40 sq mi)
- Elevation: 100 m (330 ft)
- Highest elevation: 139 m (456 ft)
- Lowest elevation: 77 m (253 ft)
- Population (2023): 367
  - Density: 59.0/km^{2} (153/sq mi)
- Time zone: UTC+01:00 (CET)
  - Summer (DST): UTC+02:00 (CEST)
- INSEE/Postal code: 76236 /76640
- ^{1} French Land Register data, which excludes lakes, ponds, glaciers > 1 km^{2} (0.386 sq mi or 247 acres) and river estuaries.

Envronville (French pronunciation: [ɑ̃vʁɔ̃vil]) is a commune in the Seine-Maritime department in the Normandy region in northern France.

== Geography ==
A farming village situated in the Pays de Caux, some 26 miles (42 km) northeast of Le Havre, at the junction of the D29 and the D5 roads.

== Population ==
Historical population
Year	Pop.	±% p.a.
1968	267	—
1975	244	−1.28%
1982	291	+2.55%
1990	305	+0.59%
1999	333	+0.98%
2007	323	−0.38%
2012	323	+0.00%
2017	343	+1.21%
2023	367	+1.13%
Source: INSEE

== Places of interest ==
- The church of Notre-Dame, dating from the thirteenth century.

== See also ==
- Communes of the Seine-Maritime department
