= Ricarville =

- Part of Terres-de-Caux
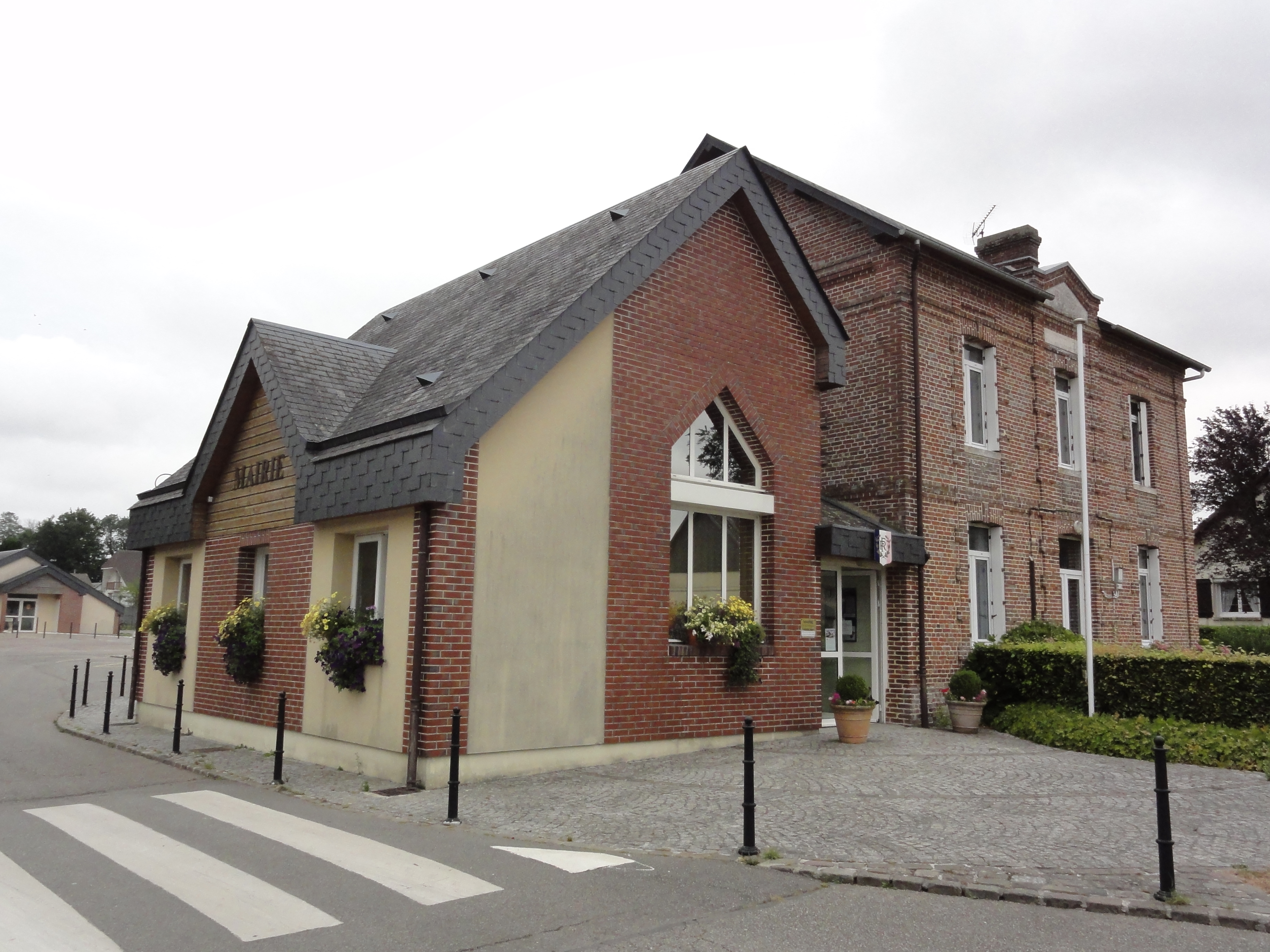
- Ricarville Town hall

- Coat of arms
- Location of Ricarville
- Location within France Location within Normandy
- Coordinates: 49°38′15″N 0°36′30″E
- Country: France
- Region: Normandy
- Department: Seine-Maritime
- Arrondissement: Le Havre
- Canton: Saint-Valery-en-Caux
- Commune: Terres-de-Caux
- Area^{1}: 4.18 km^{2} (1.61 sq mi)
- Elevation: 145 m (476 ft)
- Highest elevation: 145 m (476 ft)
- Lowest elevation: 118 m (387 ft)
- Population (2022): 313
  - Density: 74.9/km^{2} (194/sq mi)
- Time zone: UTC+01:00 (CET)
  - Summer (DST): UTC+02:00 (CEST)
- Postal code: 76640
- Website: ricarville.terres-de-caux.fr
- ^{1} French Land Register data, which excludes lakes, ponds, glaciers > 1 km^{2} (0.386 sq mi or 247 acres) and river estuaries.

Ricarville is a former commune in the Seine-Maritime department in the Normandy region in northern France. On 1 January 2017, it was merged into the new commune Terres-de-Caux.

== Geography ==
A farming village in the Pays de Caux, situated some 25 miles (40 km) northeast of Le Havre, in the triangle formed by the D928, D40 and the A29 autoroute.

== Heraldry ==
Arms of Ricarville	The arms of Ricarville are blazoned : Quarterly 1: Argent, 3 fesses gules; 2: Azure, a tower open of the field Or masoned sable; 3: Azure, a cross fleurdelysée Or; 4: Argent, a chevron gules.

== Population ==
Historical population
Year	Pop.	±% p.a.
1962	211	—
1968	205	−0.48%
1975	170	−2.64%
1982	276	+7.17%
1990	307	+1.34%
1999	306	−0.04%
2006	312	+0.28%
2022	313	+0.02%
Source: EHESS and INSEE

== Places of interest ==
- The church of the Trinity, dating from the thirteenth century.

== See also ==
- Communes of the Seine-Maritime department
