= Bennetot =

- Part of Terres-de-Caux
- Coat of arms
- Location of Bennetot
- Location within France Location within Normandy
- Coordinates: 49°40′19″N 0°33′11″E
- Country: France
- Region: Normandy
- Department: Seine-Maritime
- Arrondissement: Le Havre
- Canton: Saint-Valery-en-Caux
- Commune: Terres-de-Caux
- Area^{1}: 4.58 km^{2} (1.77 sq mi)
- Elevation: 121 m (397 ft)
- Highest elevation: 131 m (430 ft)
- Lowest elevation: 97 m (318 ft)
- Population (2023): 173
  - Density: 37.8/km^{2} (97.8/sq mi)
- Time zone: UTC+01:00 (CET)
  - Summer (DST): UTC+02:00 (CEST)
- Postal code: 76640
- ^{1} French Land Register data, which excludes lakes, ponds, glaciers > 1 km^{2} (0.386 sq mi or 247 acres) and river estuaries.

Bennetot (French pronunciation: [bɛnto]) is a former commune in the Seine-Maritime department in the Normandy region in northern France. On 1 January 2017, it was merged into the new commune Terres-de-Caux.

== Geography ==
A small farming village situated in the Pays de Caux, some 22 miles (35 km) northeast of Le Havre, at the junction of the D926 and the D217.

== Heraldry ==
Arms of Bennetot	The arms of Bennetot are blazoned : Per bend sinister, 1: Or, an abbot's crozier gules, and to sinister a maltese cross sable; 2: vert, 2 leopards Or

== Places of interest ==
- The church of St. André, dating from the seventeenth century.
- A sixteenth century manorhouse

== Notable people ==
- Réné-Aubert Vertot, French historian, was born here on the 25th Nov 1655.

== See also ==
- Communes of the Seine-Maritime department
