= Bermonville =

- Part of Terres-de-Caux
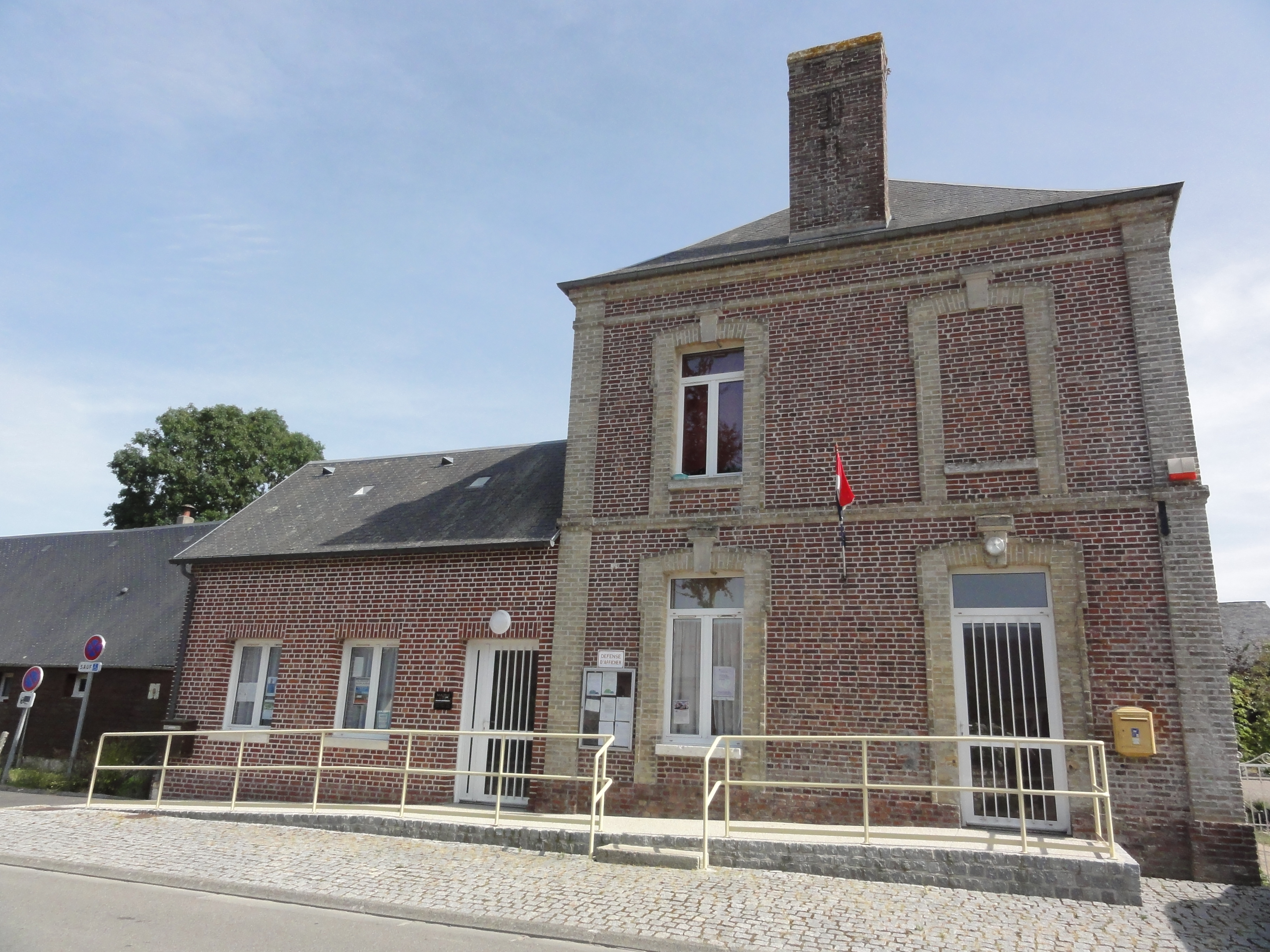
- Bermonville Town hall

- Coat of arms
- Location of Bermonville
- Location within France Location within Normandy
- Coordinates: 49°38′30″N 0°38′09″E
- Country: France
- Region: Normandy
- Department: Seine-Maritime
- Arrondissement: Le Havre
- Canton: Saint-Valery-en-Caux
- Commune: Terres-de-Caux
- Area^{1}: 7.41 km^{2} (2.86 sq mi)
- Elevation: 136 m (446 ft)
- Highest elevation: 145 m (476 ft)
- Lowest elevation: 122 m (400 ft)
- Population (2023): 476
  - Density: 64.2/km^{2} (166/sq mi)
- Time zone: UTC+01:00 (CET)
  - Summer (DST): UTC+02:00 (CEST)
- Postal code: 76640
- ^{1} French Land Register data, which excludes lakes, ponds, glaciers > 1 km^{2} (0.386 sq mi or 247 acres) and river estuaries.

Bermonville is a former commune in the Seine-Maritime department in the Normandy region in northern France. On 1 January 2017, it was merged into the new commune Terres-de-Caux.

== Geography ==
A farming village situated in the Pays de Caux, some 25 miles (40 km) northeast of Le Havre, at the junction of the D926 and the D29. Junction 8 of the A29 autoroute is within the commune's borders.

== Heraldry ==
Arms of Bermonville	The arms of Bermonville are blazoned : Vert, a bend chequy argent and gules of 2 traits, between a lion passant and a motte and bailey argent, and on a chief Or, a crosslet between two spur rowels [mullets voided] azure.

== Places of interest ==
- The church of Notre-Dame, dating from the twelfth century.
- A sixteenth century manorhouse

== See also ==
- Communes of the Seine-Maritime department
