= Fauville-en-Caux =

- Part of Terres-de-Caux
- Coat of arms
- Location of Fauville-en-Caux
- Location within France Location within Normandy
- Coordinates: 49°39′15″N 0°35′32″E
- Country: France
- Region: Normandy
- Department: Seine-Maritime
- Arrondissement: Le Havre
- Canton: Saint-Valery-en-Caux
- Commune: Terres-de-Caux
- Area^{1}: 8.11 km^{2} (3.13 sq mi)
- Elevation: 124 m (407 ft)
- Highest elevation: 141 m (463 ft)
- Lowest elevation: 109 m (358 ft)
- Population (2022): 2,354
  - Density: 290/km^{2} (752/sq mi)
- Time zone: UTC+01:00 (CET)
  - Summer (DST): UTC+02:00 (CEST)
- Postal code: 76640
- ^{1} French Land Register data, which excludes lakes, ponds, glaciers > 1 km^{2} (0.386 sq mi or 247 acres) and river estuaries.

Fauville-en-Caux (French pronunciation: [fovil ɑ̃ ko], lit. 'Fauville in Caux') is a former commune in the Seine-Maritime department in the Normandy region in northern France. On 1 January 2017, it was merged into the new commune Terres-de-Caux.

== Geography ==
A small town of farming and associated light industry situated in the Pays de Caux, some 29 miles (47 km) northeast of Le Havre, at the junction of the D926, D50, and the D149 roads.

== Heraldry ==
Arms of Fauville-en-Caux	The arms of Fauville-en-Caux are blazoned : Per pale gules and argent, issuant from a heart argent, the head and neck of a cock azure and tail gules. (the heart forms a stylized body for the rooster)

== Population ==
Historical population
Year	Pop.	±% p.a.
1962	1,363	—
1968	1,366	+0.04%
1975	1,645	+2.69%
1982	1,751	+0.90%
1990	1,871	+0.83%
1999	1,937	+0.39%
2006	2,047	+0.79%
2022	2,354	+0.88%
Source: EHESS and INSEE

== Places of interest ==
- The church of St.Jean, dating from the thirteenth century.

== Notable people ==
- Marius Grout (1903-1946), was a French writer

== See also ==
- Communes of the Seine-Maritime department
