= Canton of Valmont =

Coordinates: 49°45′16″N 0°30′27″E

Valmont
- Former canton
- Interactive map of Valmont
- Country: France
- Region: Normandy
- Department: Seine-Maritime
- No. of communes: {{{nbcomm}}}
- Disbanded: 2015
- Area: 129.37 km^{2} (49.95 sq mi)
- Population (2012): 11,309
  - Density: 87.416/km^{2} (226.41/sq mi)

The Canton of Valmont is a former canton situated in the Seine-Maritime département and in the Haute-Normandie region of northern France. It was disbanded following the French canton reorganisation which came into effect in March 2015. It consisted of 22 communes, which joined the canton of Fécamp in 2015. It had a total of 11,309 inhabitants (2012).

== Geography ==
An area of forestry, farming and associated light industry in the arrondissement of Le Havre, centred on the village of Valmont. The altitude varies from 0m (Életot) to 134m (Riville) with an average altitude of 108m.

The canton comprised 22 communes:

- Ancretteville-sur-Mer
- Angerville-la-Martel
- Colleville
- Contremoulins
- Criquetot-le-Mauconduit
- Écretteville-sur-Mer
- Életot
- Gerponville
- Limpiville
- Riville
- Sainte-Hélène-Bondeville
- Saint-Pierre-en-Port
- Sassetot-le-Mauconduit
- Sorquainville
- Thérouldeville
- Theuville-aux-Maillots
- Thiergeville
- Thiétreville
- Toussaint
- Valmont
- Vinnemerville
- Ypreville-Biville

== Population ==
Historical population Canton of Valmont
Year	1962	1968	1975	1982	1990	1999
Pop.	8,349	8,893	8,345	9,138	9,798	9,850
±%	—	+6.5%	−6.2%	+9.5%	+7.2%	+0.5%
From the year 1962 on: No double counting – residents of multiple communes (e.g. students and military personnel) are counted only once. Source: INSEE

== See also ==
- Arrondissements of the Seine-Maritime department
- Cantons of the Seine-Maritime department
- Communes of the Seine-Maritime department
