= Communauté de communes du Canton de Valmont =

Coordinates: 49.7271°N 0.4853°E

Canton de Valmont
- Former communauté de communes
- Interactive map of Canton de Valmont
- Country: France
- Region: Normandy
- Department: Seine-Maritime
- No. of communes: {{{nbcomm}}}
- Established: 2000
- Disbanded: 2017
- Area: 129.37 km^{2} (49.95 sq mi)
- Population (1999): 9,850
  - Density: 76.1/km^{2} (197/sq mi)

The communauté de communes du Canton de Valmont was located in the Seine-Maritime département of the Normandy region of northern France. It was created in January 2000. It was merged into the Communauté d'agglomération de Fécamp Caux Littoral in January 2017.

== Participants ==
The Communauté de communes comprised the following communes:

- Ancretteville-sur-Mer
- Angerville-la-Martel
- Colleville
- Contremoulins
- Criquetot-le-Mauconduit
- Écretteville-sur-Mer
- Életot
- Gerponville
- Limpiville
- Riville
- Sainte-Hélène-Bondeville
- Saint-Pierre-en-Port
- Sassetot-le-Mauconduit
- Sorquainville
- Thérouldeville
- Theuville-aux-Maillots
- Thiergeville
- Thiétreville
- Toussaint
- Valmont
- Vinnemerville
- Ypreville-Biville

== See also ==
- Communes of the Seine-Maritime department
