= Criquebeuf-en-Caux =

- Commune
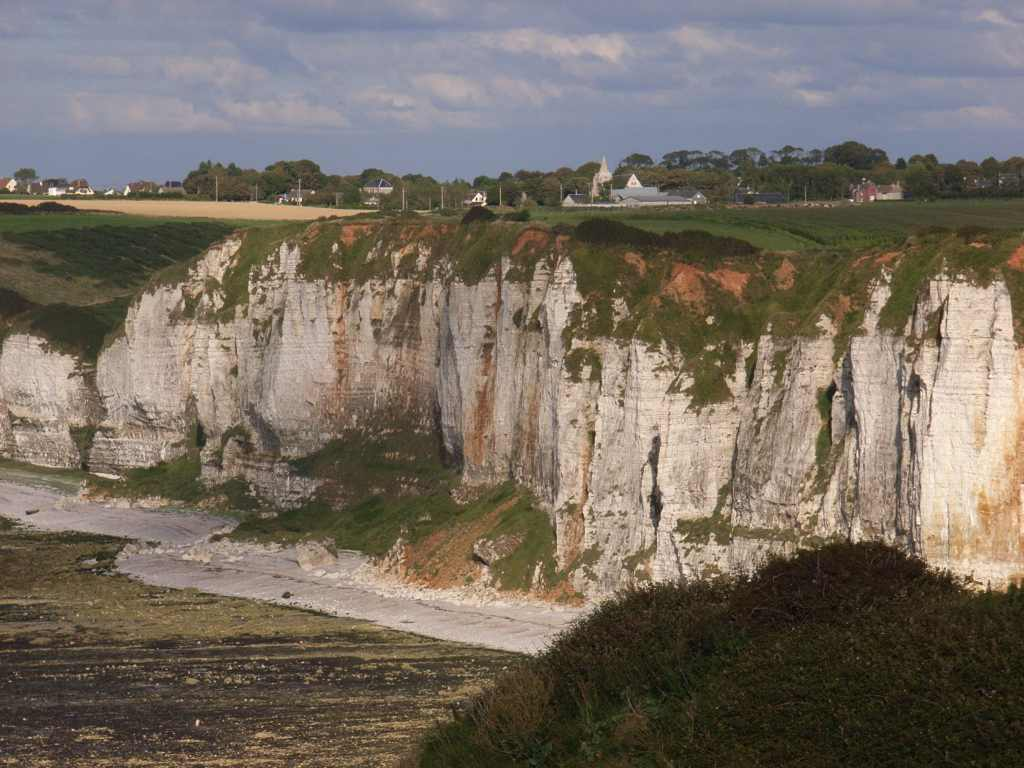
- A general view of Criquebeuf-en-Caux

- Coat of arms
- Location of Criquebeuf-en-Caux
- Location within France Location within Normandy
- Coordinates: 49°44′28″N 0°20′01″E
- Country: France
- Region: Normandy
- Department: Seine-Maritime
- Arrondissement: Le Havre
- Canton: Fécamp
- Intercommunality: CA Fécamp Caux Littoral

Government
  - Mayor (2026–32): Ludovic Bacq
- Area^{1}: 2.08 km^{2} (0.80 sq mi)
- Elevation: 102 m (335 ft)
- Highest elevation: 102 m (335 ft)
- Lowest elevation: 5 m (16 ft)
- Population (2023): 405
  - Density: 195/km^{2} (504/sq mi)
- Time zone: UTC+01:00 (CET)
  - Summer (DST): UTC+02:00 (CEST)
- INSEE/Postal code: 76194 /76111
- ^{1} French Land Register data, which excludes lakes, ponds, glaciers > 1 km^{2} (0.386 sq mi or 247 acres) and river estuaries.

Criquebeuf-en-Caux (French pronunciation: [kʁikbœf ɑ̃ ko], literally Criquebeuf in Caux) is a commune in the Seine-Maritime department in the Normandy region in northern France.

== Geography ==
The commune is centered on a farming village situated in the Pays de Caux, some 25 miles (40 km) northeast of Le Havre, at the junction of the D211 and D940 roads. The commune's cliffs face the English Channel.

== Heraldry ==
Arms of Criquebeuf-en-Caux	The arms of Criquebeuf-en-Caux are blazoned : Azure, a chevron argent between 2 mallets and a peacock in his pride Or.

== Population ==
Historical population
Year	Pop.	±% p.a.
1968	170	—
1975	197	+2.13%
1982	275	+4.88%
1990	417	+5.34%
1999	403	−0.38%
2007	391	−0.38%
2012	347	−2.36%
2017	404	+3.09%
2023	405	+0.04%
Source: INSEE

== Places of interest ==
- The remains of the motte of a feudal castle.
- The church of St.Martin, dating from the sixteenth century.

== See also ==
- Communes of the Seine-Maritime department
