= Tourville-les-Ifs =

- Commune
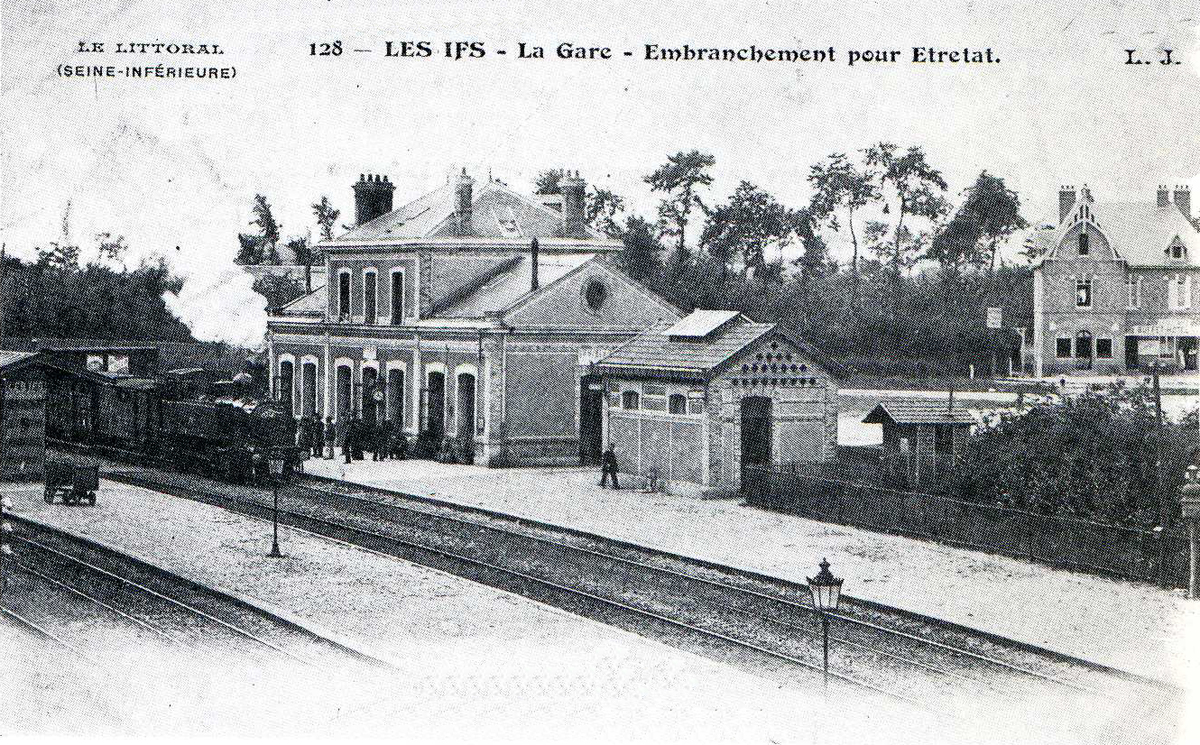
- The railway station in Les Ifs
- Location of Tourville-les-Ifs
- Location within France Location within Normandy
- Coordinates: 49°42′54″N 0°24′05″E
- Country: France
- Region: Normandy
- Department: Seine-Maritime
- Arrondissement: Le Havre
- Canton: Fécamp
- Intercommunality: CA Fécamp Caux Littoral

Government
  - Mayor (2026–32): Dominique Goulet
- Area^{1}: 8.34 km^{2} (3.22 sq mi)
- Elevation: 123 m (404 ft)
- Highest elevation: 131 m (430 ft)
- Lowest elevation: 30 m (98 ft)
- Population (2023): 729
  - Density: 87.4/km^{2} (226/sq mi)
- Time zone: UTC+01:00 (CET)
  - Summer (DST): UTC+02:00 (CEST)
- INSEE/Postal code: 76706 /76400
- ^{1} French Land Register data, which excludes lakes, ponds, glaciers > 1 km^{2} (0.386 sq mi or 247 acres) and river estuaries.

Tourville-les-Ifs is a commune in the Seine-Maritime department in the Normandy region in northern France.

== Geography ==
A farming village in the Pays de Caux, situated some 21 miles (34 km) northeast of Le Havre, at the junction of the D73 and D68 roads.

== Population ==
Historical population
Year	Pop.	±% p.a.
1968	384	—
1975	427	+1.53%
1982	449	+0.72%
1990	516	+1.75%
1999	547	+0.65%
2007	534	−0.30%
2012	550	+0.59%
2017	613	+2.19%
2023	729	+2.93%
Source: INSEE

== Places of interest ==
- The church of St. Martin, dating from the nineteenth century.
- The sixteenth-century chateau des Ifs.
- Traces of an eleventh-century castle.
- The sixteenth-century priory.

== See also ==
- Communes of the Seine-Maritime department
