= Saint-Léonard, Seine-Maritime =

Saint-Léonard
- Commune
- Location of Saint-Léonard
- Location within France Location within Normandy
- Coordinates: 49°44′34″N 0°21′33″E
- Country: France
- Region: Normandy
- Department: Seine-Maritime
- Arrondissement: Le Havre
- Canton: Fécamp
- Intercommunality: CA Fécamp Caux Littoral

Government
  - Mayor (2020–2026): Bernard Hoguet
- Area^{1}: 11.92 km^{2} (4.60 sq mi)
- Elevation: 100 m (330 ft)
- Highest elevation: 114 m (374 ft)
- Lowest elevation: 0 m (0 ft)
- Population (2023): 1,693
  - Density: 142.0/km^{2} (367.9/sq mi)
- Time zone: UTC+01:00 (CET)
  - Summer (DST): UTC+02:00 (CEST)
- INSEE/Postal code: 76600 /76400
- ^{1} French Land Register data, which excludes lakes, ponds, glaciers > 1 km^{2} (0.386 sq mi or 247 acres) and river estuaries.

Saint-Léonard (French pronunciation: [sɛ̃ leɔnaʁ]) is a commune in the Seine-Maritime department in the Normandy region in northern France.

== Geography ==
An area of farming and light industry, in the Pays de Caux, situated some 22 miles (35 km) northeast of Le Havre, at the junction of the D940 and D79 roads. The commune is just south of Fécamp and comprises the village itself and several hamlets. The coast faces the English Channel.

== Population ==
Historical population
Year	Pop.	±% p.a.
1968	1,395	—
1975	1,627	+2.22%
1982	1,660	+0.29%
1990	1,680	+0.15%
1999	1,690	+0.07%
2007	1,821	+0.94%
2012	1,849	+0.31%
2017	1,724	−1.39%
2023	1,693	−0.30%
Source: INSEE

== Places of interest ==
- The ruins of the thirteenth-century Hogues castle.
- The church of St. Leonard, dating from the eleventh century.

== See also ==
- Communes of the Seine-Maritime department
