= Communauté d'agglomération de Fécamp Caux Littoral =

Fécamp Caux Littoral
- Communauté d'agglomération
- Interactive map of Fécamp Caux Littoral
- Coordinates: 49.76°N 0.38°E
- Country: France
- Region: Normandy
- Department: Seine-Maritime
- No. of communes: {{{nbcomm}}}
- Established: 2015
- Area: 207.1 km^{2} (80.0 sq mi)
- Population (2019): 38,310
  - Density: 185.0/km^{2} (479.1/sq mi)

The Communauté d'agglomération de Fécamp Caux Littoral is the communauté d'agglomération, an intercommunal structure, centred on the town of Fécamp. It is located in the Seine-Maritime department, in the Normandy region, northern France. It was created on 1 January 2015 from the former communauté de communes de Fécamp. It absorbed the former Communauté de communes du Canton de Valmont on 1 January 2017. Its area is 207.1 km^{2}. Its population was 38,310 in 2019, of which 18,041 in Fécamp proper. Its seat is in Fécamp.

== Composition ==
The communauté d'agglomération consists of the following 33 communes:

1. Ancretteville-sur-Mer
2. Angerville-la-Martel
3. Colleville
4. Contremoulins
5. Criquebeuf-en-Caux
6. Écretteville-sur-Mer
7. Életot
8. Épreville
9. Fécamp
10. Froberville
11. Ganzeville
12. Gerponville
13. Gerville
14. Limpiville
15. Les Loges
16. Maniquerville
17. Riville
18. Sainte-Hélène-Bondeville
19. Saint-Léonard
20. Saint-Pierre-en-Port
21. Sassetot-le-Mauconduit
22. Senneville-sur-Fécamp
23. Sorquainville
24. Thérouldeville
25. Theuville-aux-Maillots
26. Thiergeville
27. Thiétreville
28. Tourville-les-Ifs
29. Toussaint
30. Valmont
31. Vattetot-sur-Mer
32. Yport
33. Ypreville-Biville
