= Froberville =

- Commune
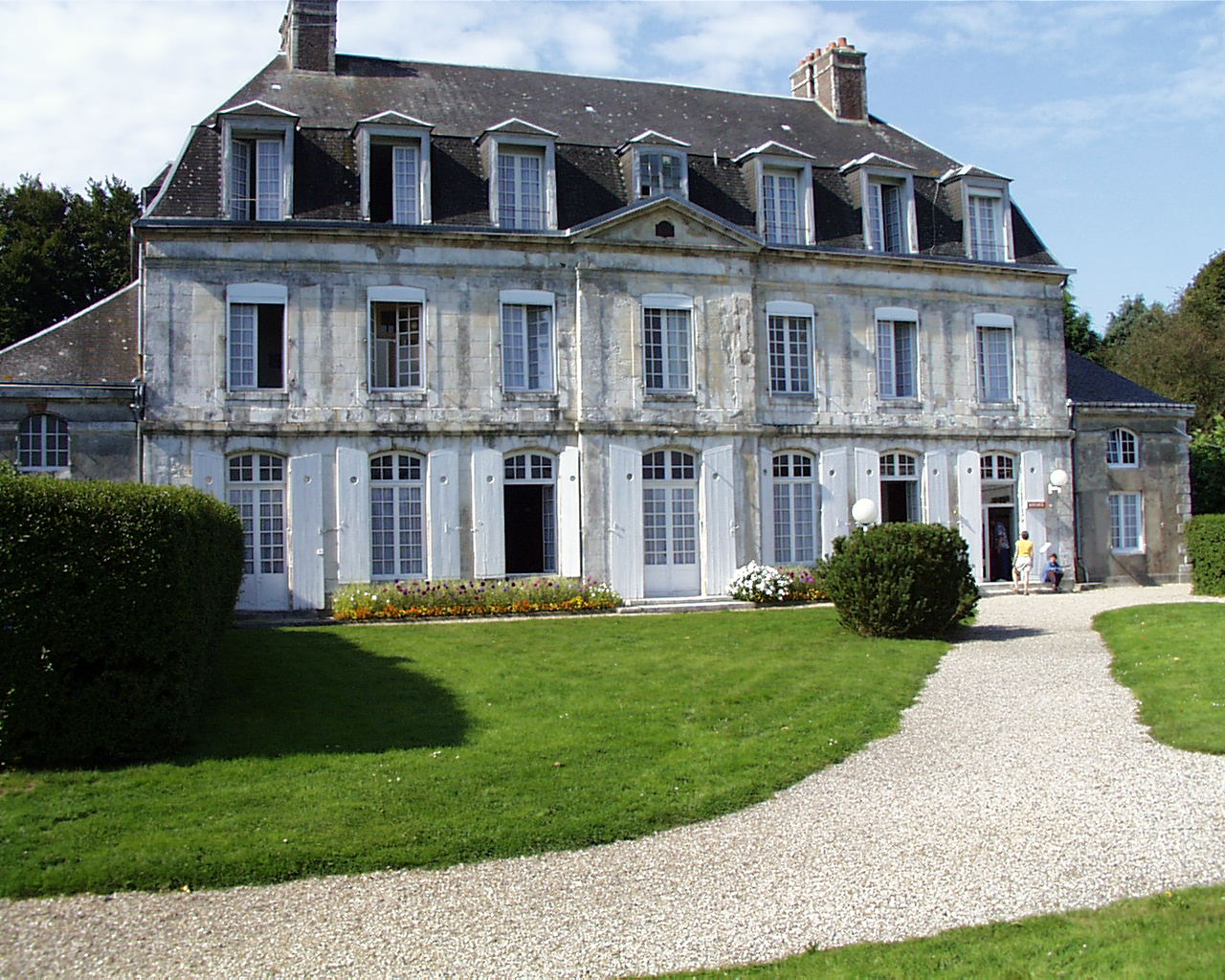
- The chateau in Froberville

- Coat of arms
- Location of Froberville
- Location within France Location within Normandy
- Coordinates: 49°43′21″N 0°19′56″E
- Country: France
- Region: Normandy
- Department: Seine-Maritime
- Arrondissement: Le Havre
- Canton: Fécamp
- Intercommunality: CA Fécamp Caux Littoral

Government
  - Mayor (2026–32): Olivier Coursault
- Area^{1}: 5.88 km^{2} (2.27 sq mi)
- Elevation: 91 m (299 ft)
- Highest elevation: 112 m (367 ft)
- Lowest elevation: 56 m (184 ft)
- Population (2023): 1,193
  - Density: 203/km^{2} (525/sq mi)
- Time zone: UTC+01:00 (CET)
  - Summer (DST): UTC+02:00 (CEST)
- INSEE/Postal code: 76291 /76400
- ^{1} French Land Register data, which excludes lakes, ponds, glaciers > 1 km^{2} (0.386 sq mi or 247 acres) and river estuaries.

Froberville (French pronunciation: [fʁɔbɛʁvil]) is a commune in the Seine-Maritime department in the Normandy region in northern France.

== Geography ==
A farming village situated in the Pays de Caux, some 21 miles (34 km) northeast of Le Havre, at the junction of the D940 and D279 roads.

== Heraldry ==
Arms of Froberville	The arms of Froberville are blazoned : Azure, a chevron argent between 2 leopard's heads affronty (erased) and a chess rook Or.

== Population ==
Historical population
Year	Pop.	±% p.a.
1968	358	—
1975	459	+3.61%
1982	619	+4.36%
1990	732	+2.12%
1999	810	+1.13%
2007	1,052	+3.32%
2012	1,086	+0.64%
2017	1,245	+2.77%
2023	1,193	−0.71%
Source: INSEE

== Places of interest ==
- The church of St.Hélène, dating from the nineteenth century.
- The Château d'Hainneville
- The fourteenth century chapel of St. Eloi.

== See also ==
- Communes of the Seine-Maritime department
