= Maniquerville =

- Commune
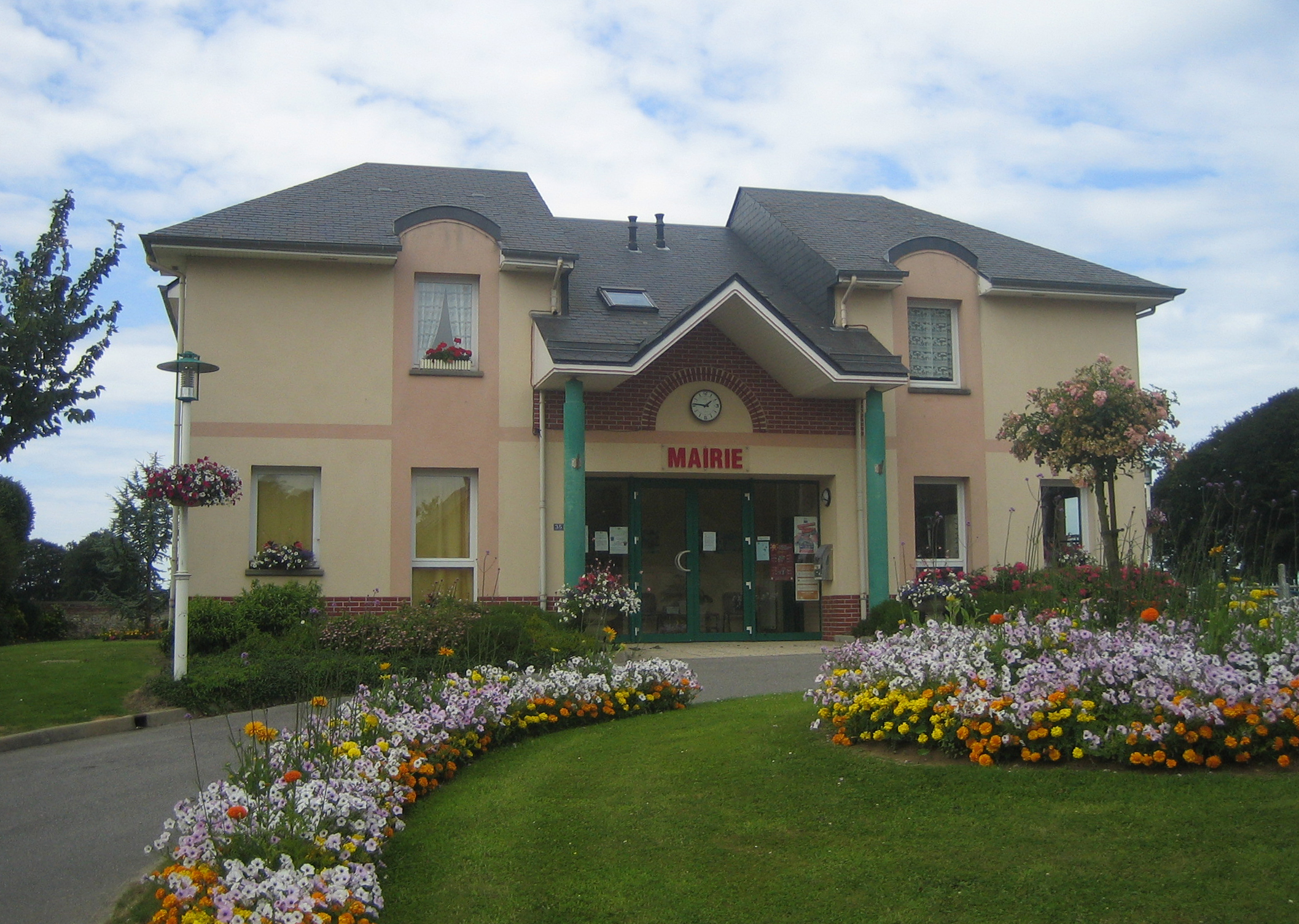
- The town hall in Maniquerville

- Coat of arms
- Location of Maniquerville
- Location within France Location within Normandy
- Coordinates: 49°41′35″N 0°20′39″E
- Country: France
- Region: Normandy
- Department: Seine-Maritime
- Arrondissement: Le Havre
- Canton: Fécamp
- Intercommunality: CA Fécamp Caux Littoral

Government
  - Mayor (2020–2026): Céline Leconte
- Area^{1}: 2.55 km^{2} (0.98 sq mi)
- Elevation: 100 m (330 ft)
- Highest elevation: 119 m (390 ft)
- Lowest elevation: 82 m (269 ft)
- Population (2023): 409
  - Density: 160/km^{2} (415/sq mi)
- Time zone: UTC+01:00 (CET)
  - Summer (DST): UTC+02:00 (CEST)
- INSEE/Postal code: 76406 /76400
- ^{1} French Land Register data, which excludes lakes, ponds, glaciers > 1 km^{2} (0.386 sq mi or 247 acres) and river estuaries.

Maniquerville (French pronunciation: [manikɛʁvil]) is a commune in the Seine-Maritime department in the Normandy region in northern France.

== Geography ==
A farming village in the Pays de Caux, some 15 miles (24 km) northeast of Le Havre, at the junction of the D11 and D279 roads.

== Population ==
Historical population
Year	Pop.	±% p.a.
1968	234	—
1975	247	+0.78%
1982	375	+6.15%
1990	348	−0.93%
1999	304	−1.49%
2007	446	+4.91%
2012	420	−1.19%
2017	411	−0.43%
2023	409	−0.08%
Source: INSEE

== Places of interest ==
- The church of St.Martin, dating from the sixteenth century.

== See also ==
- Communes of the Seine-Maritime department
