= Senneville-sur-Fécamp =

- Commune
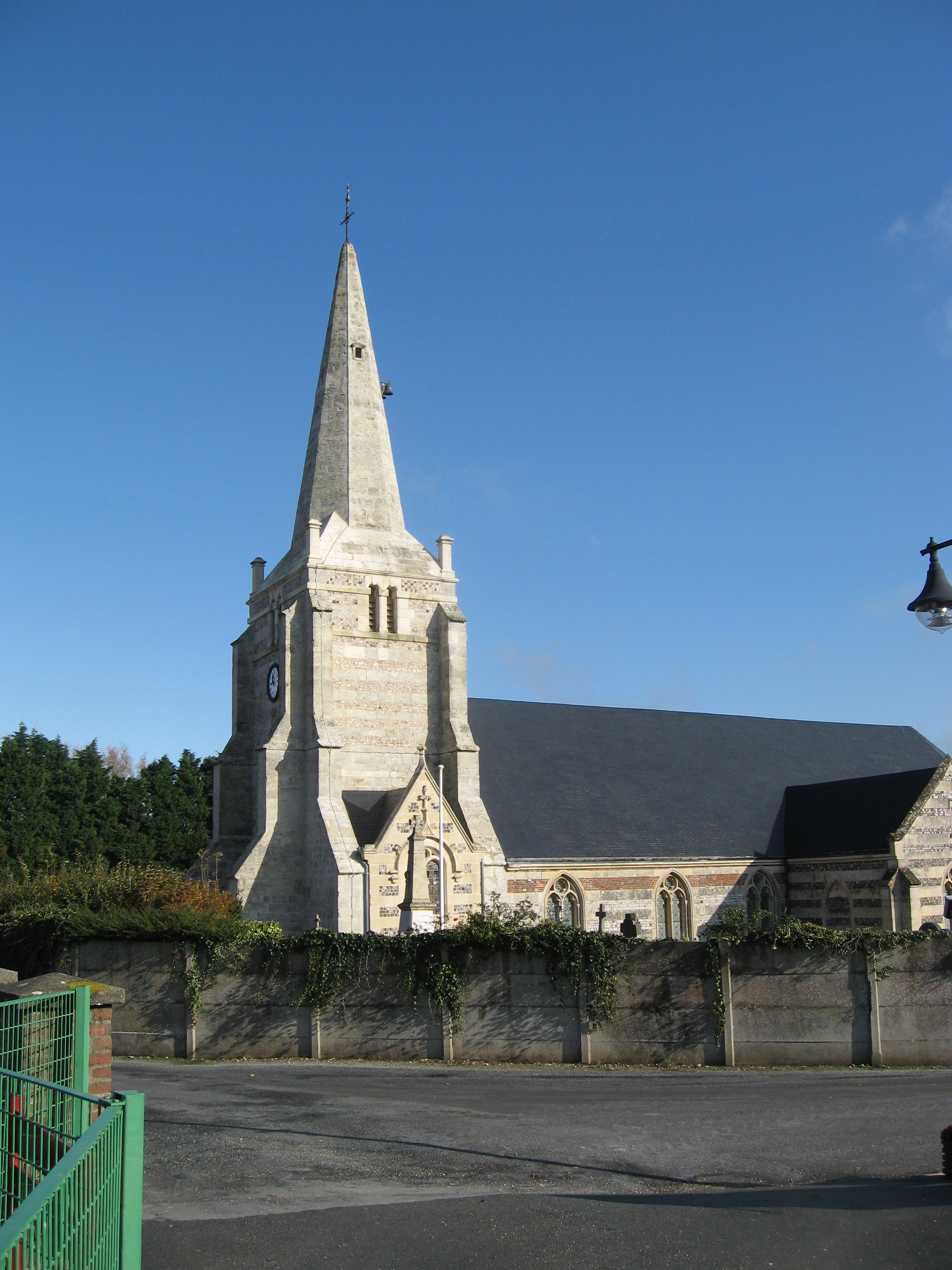
- The church in Senneville-sur-Fécamp

- Coat of arms
- Location of Senneville-sur-Fécamp
- Location within France Location within Normandy
- Coordinates: 49°46′24″N 0°25′02″E
- Country: France
- Region: Normandy
- Department: Seine-Maritime
- Arrondissement: Le Havre
- Canton: Fécamp
- Intercommunality: CA Fécamp Caux Littoral

Government
  - Mayor (2026–32): Pascal Lecourt
- Area^{1}: 4.73 km^{2} (1.83 sq mi)
- Elevation: 110 m (360 ft)
- Highest elevation: 124 m (407 ft)
- Lowest elevation: 0 m (0 ft)
- Population (2023): 868
  - Density: 184/km^{2} (475/sq mi)
- Time zone: UTC+01:00 (CET)
  - Summer (DST): UTC+02:00 (CEST)
- INSEE/Postal code: 76670 /76400
- ^{1} French Land Register data, which excludes lakes, ponds, glaciers > 1 km^{2} (0.386 sq mi or 247 acres) and river estuaries.

Senneville-sur-Fécamp (French pronunciation: [sɛnvil syʁ fekɑ̃], literally Senneville on Fécamp) is a commune in the Seine-Maritime department in the Normandy region in northern France.

== Geography ==
A farming village, by the coast of the English Channel, in the Pays de Caux, situated some 30 miles (48 km) northeast of Le Havre, at the junction of the D79, D925 and D73 roads. Spectacular limestone cliffs rise up to around 100 m. There is also a local beach which is used by the residents. There are many bed and breakfasts in and around the village.

== Heraldry ==
Arms of Senneville-sur-Fécamp	The arms of Senneville-sur-Fécamp are blazoned : Quarterly 1&4: Chequy azure and Or; 2: Azur, a crab Or; 3: 2 ears of wheat in saltire Or; a cross argent; overall on an inescutcheon gules, a latin cross with base Or.

== Population ==
Historical population
Year	Pop.	±% p.a.
1968	527	—
1975	533	+0.16%
1982	540	+0.19%
1990	565	+0.57%
1999	628	+1.18%
2007	770	+2.58%
2012	813	+1.09%
2017	882	+1.64%
2023	868	−0.27%
Source: INSEE

== Places of interest ==
- The church of St. Vaast, dating from the thirteenth century.
- A nineteenth-century chateau.

== See also ==
- Communes of the Seine-Maritime department
