= Les Loges, Seine-Maritime =

Les Loges
- Commune
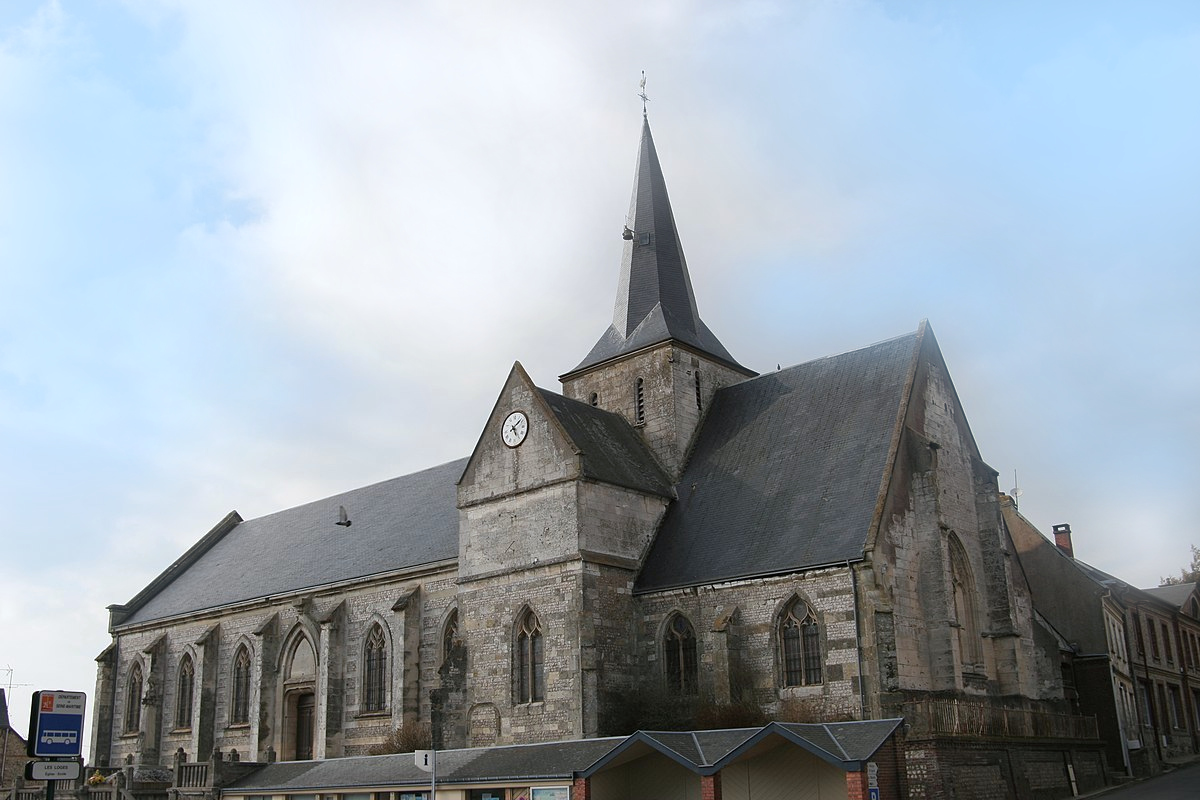
- The church in Les Loges
- Location of Les Loges
- Location within France Location within Normandy
- Coordinates: 49°42′01″N 0°17′03″E
- Country: France
- Region: Normandy
- Department: Seine-Maritime
- Arrondissement: Le Havre
- Canton: Fécamp
- Intercommunality: CA Fécamp Caux Littoral

Government
  - Mayor (2026–32): David Malbranque
- Area^{1}: 14.86 km^{2} (5.74 sq mi)
- Elevation: 100 m (330 ft)
- Highest elevation: 121 m (397 ft)
- Lowest elevation: 0 m (0 ft)
- Population (2023): 1,126
  - Density: 75.77/km^{2} (196.3/sq mi)
- Time zone: UTC+01:00 (CET)
  - Summer (DST): UTC+02:00 (CEST)
- INSEE/Postal code: 76390 /76790
- ^{1} French Land Register data, which excludes lakes, ponds, glaciers > 1 km^{2} (0.386 sq mi or 247 acres) and river estuaries.

Les Loges (French pronunciation: [le lɔʒ]) is a commune in the Seine-Maritime department in the Normandy region in northern France.

== Geography ==
Les Loges is a farming village in the Pays de Caux, some 13 miles (21 km) north of Le Havre, at the junction of the D72, D74 and D940 roads.

== History ==
The name of the commune comes from the French word loge, meaning a cabin or shelter, or more usually in English, a hunting-lodge.
The village is located almost at the end of the old Roman road linking Lillebonne with Étretat.
William the Conqueror's granddaughter, the Empress Matilda gave this area to a Nicolas Estouteville in the twelfth century, to thank him for his support and loyalty. The seigneurie belonged to the family of Estouteville for eight centuries.
At the end of the nineteenth century, the Grimaldi family (of Monaco), who also bear the name of Estouteville, used the manorhouse as a residence resort.

== Population ==
Historical population
Year	Pop.	±% p.a.
1968	916	—
1975	873	−0.68%
1982	999	+1.94%
1990	1,015	+0.20%
1999	1,036	+0.23%
2007	1,140	+1.20%
2012	1,164	+0.42%
2017	1,157	−0.12%
2023	1,126	−0.45%
Source: INSEE

== Places of interest ==
- The church of Notre-Dame, dating from the sixteenth century.
- The Manor d'Estouteville, originally eleventh century.
- The Town Hall, built in the nineteenth century.

== See also ==
- Communes of the Seine-Maritime department
