= Gerville =

- Commune
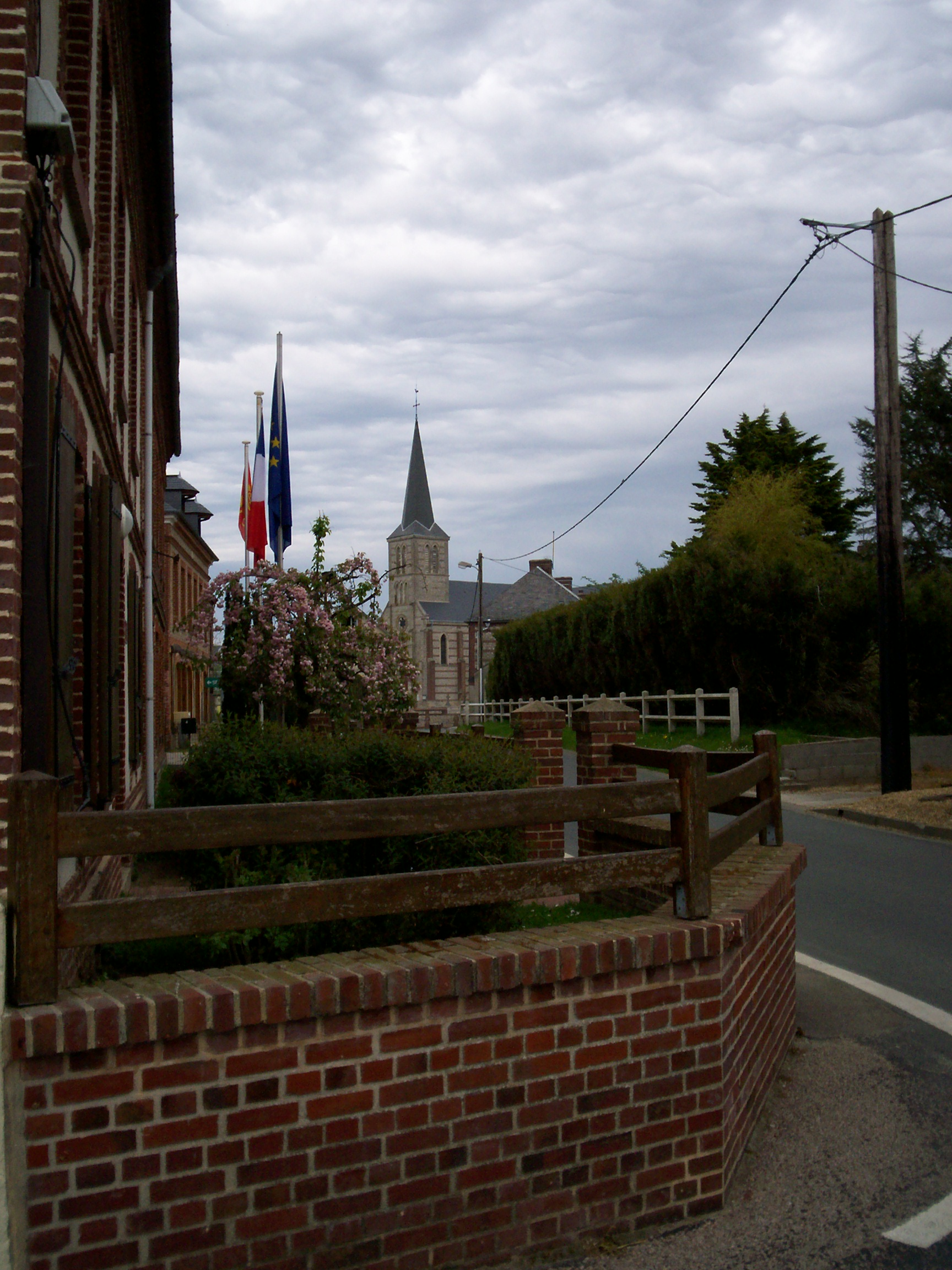
- The church in Gerville

- Coat of arms
- Location of Gerville
- Location within France Location within Normandy
- Coordinates: 49°41′48″N 0°19′49″E
- Country: France
- Region: Normandy
- Department: Seine-Maritime
- Arrondissement: Le Havre
- Canton: Fécamp
- Intercommunality: CA Fécamp Caux Littoral

Government
  - Mayor (2026–32): Estelle Guénot
- Area^{1}: 3.01 km^{2} (1.16 sq mi)
- Elevation: 102 m (335 ft)
- Highest elevation: 125 m (410 ft)
- Lowest elevation: 90 m (300 ft)
- Population (2023): 412
  - Density: 137/km^{2} (355/sq mi)
- Time zone: UTC+01:00 (CET)
  - Summer (DST): UTC+02:00 (CEST)
- INSEE/Postal code: 76300 /76790
- ^{1} French Land Register data, which excludes lakes, ponds, glaciers > 1 km^{2} (0.386 sq mi or 247 acres) and river estuaries.

Gerville (French pronunciation: [ʒɛʁvil]) is a commune in the Seine-Maritime department in the Normandy region in northern France.

== Geography ==
A farming village situated in the Pays de Caux, some 16 miles (26 km) northeast of Le Havre, at the junction of the D79 and D11 roads.
The commune comprises 6 hamlets or place-names: La Mare Chanseuse, Le Bihorel, La Hêtrée, Le Parlement, Le Beau Soleil and Vue-du-Coquet

== Heraldry ==
Arms of Gerville	The arms of Gerville are blazoned : Argent, on a bend azure between 2 phrygian caps gules, 3 mullets (of 6) voided Or.

== Population ==
Historical population
Year	Pop.	±% p.a.
1968	272	—
1975	235	−2.07%
1982	250	+0.89%
1990	351	+4.33%
1999	381	+0.92%
2007	413	+1.01%
2012	377	−1.81%
2017	424	+2.38%
2023	412	−0.48%
Source: INSEE

== Places of interest ==
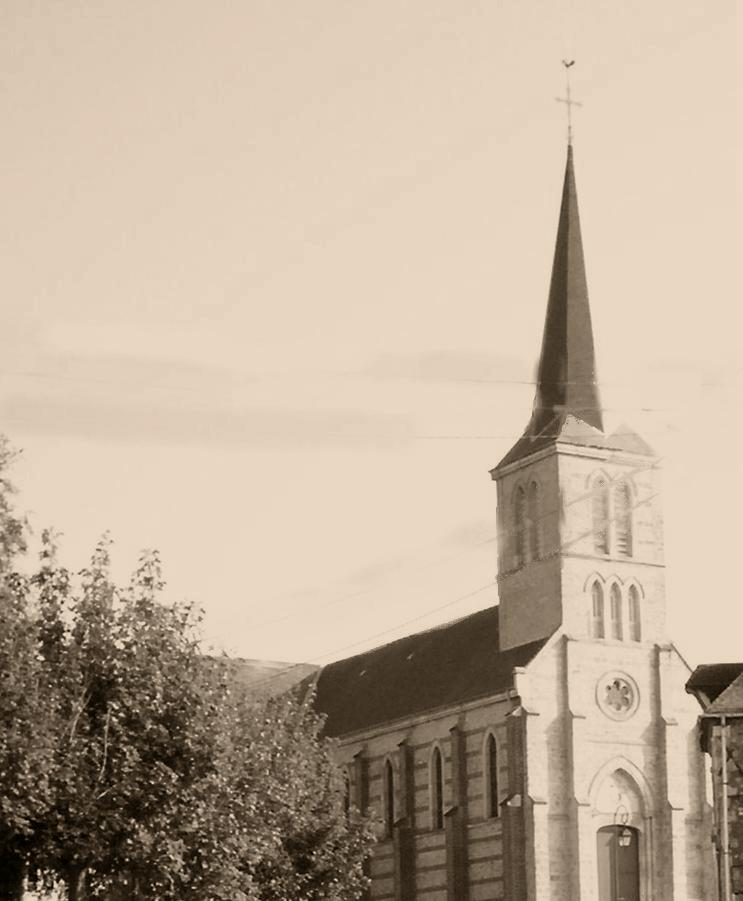
Gerville church

- The church of St.Michel, dating from the nineteenth century.
- The remains of a 19th-century chateau, destroyed by fire in 1944.

== See also ==
- Communes of the Seine-Maritime department
