= Ganzeville =

- Commune
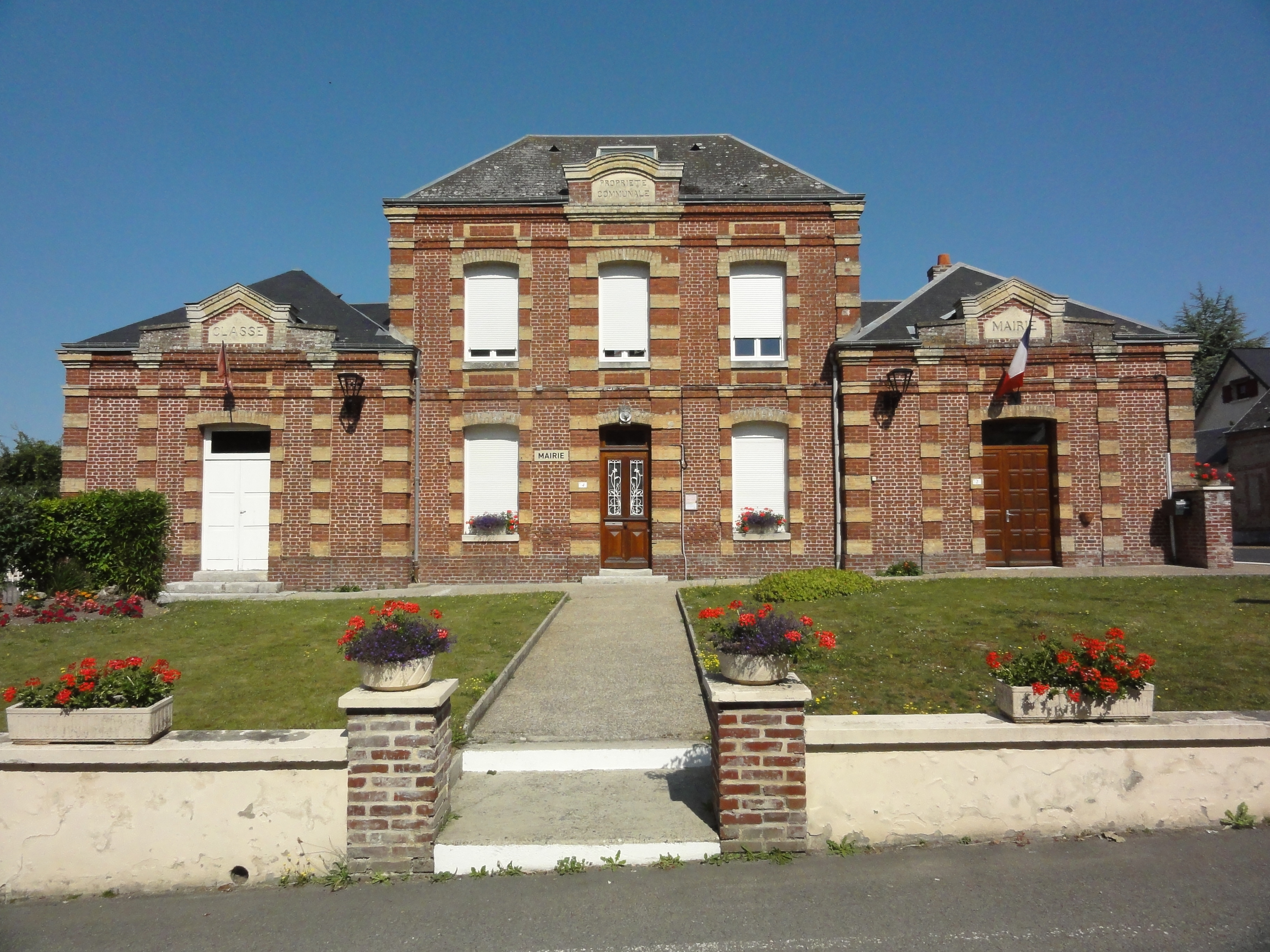
- Ganzeville Town hall

- Coat of arms
- Location of Ganzeville
- Location within France Location within Normandy
- Coordinates: 49°44′09″N 0°24′45″E
- Country: France
- Region: Normandy
- Department: Seine-Maritime
- Arrondissement: Le Havre
- Canton: Fécamp
- Intercommunality: CA Fécamp Caux Littoral

Government
  - Mayor (2026–32): Jean-Marie Crochemore
- Area^{1}: 3.96 km^{2} (1.53 sq mi)
- Elevation: 32 m (105 ft)
- Highest elevation: 122 m (400 ft)
- Lowest elevation: 16 m (52 ft)
- Population (2023): 454
  - Density: 115/km^{2} (297/sq mi)
- Time zone: UTC+01:00 (CET)
  - Summer (DST): UTC+02:00 (CEST)
- INSEE/Postal code: 76298 /76400
- ^{1} French Land Register data, which excludes lakes, ponds, glaciers > 1 km^{2} (0.386 sq mi or 247 acres) and river estuaries.

Ganzeville (French pronunciation: [ɡɑ̃zvil]) is a commune in the Seine-Maritime department in the Normandy region in northern France.

== Geography ==
A farming village situated in the Pays de Caux, some 24 miles (39 km) northeast of Le Havre, near the junction of the D28 and D68 roads.

== Heraldry ==
Arms of Ganzeville	The arms of Ganzeville are blazoned : Argent, on a chevron gules between 2 lozenges azure and an alerion gules, a rose Or.

== Population ==
Historical population
Year	Pop.	±% p.a.
1968	459	—
1975	416	−1.40%
1982	467	+1.67%
1990	404	−1.80%
1999	442	+1.00%
2007	446	+0.11%
2012	490	+1.90%
2017	477	−0.54%
2023	454	−0.82%
Source: INSEE

== Places of interest ==
- The church of St.Remi, dating from the eleventh century.
- The remains of an old castle on an island in the river.
- A seventeenth century chateau.

== See also ==
- Communes of the Seine-Maritime department
