= Canton of Fécamp =

Coordinates: 49°43′33″N 0°20′56″E

Fécamp
- Canton
- Country: France
- Region: Normandy
- Department: Seine-Maritime
- No. of communes: {{{nbcomm}}}
- Area: 215.42 km^{2} (83.17 sq mi)
- Population (2023): 37,806
  - Density: 175.50/km^{2} (454.54/sq mi)
- INSEE code: 76 11

The Canton of Fécamp is a canton in the Seine-Maritime département and in the Normandy region of northern France.

== Geography ==
Fécamp is an area of fishing, farming, quarrying and light industry in the arrondissement of Le Havre, centred on a port of Fécamp.

== Composition ==
At the French canton reorganisation which came into effect in March 2015, the canton was expanded from 13 to 35 communes:

- Ancretteville-sur-Mer
- Angerville-la-Martel
- Colleville
- Contremoulins
- Criquebeuf-en-Caux
- Criquetot-le-Mauconduit
- Écretteville-sur-Mer
- Életot
- Épreville
- Fécamp
- Froberville
- Ganzeville
- Gerponville
- Gerville
- Limpiville
- Les Loges
- Maniquerville
- Riville
- Sainte-Hélène-Bondeville
- Saint-Léonard
- Saint-Pierre-en-Port
- Sassetot-le-Mauconduit
- Senneville-sur-Fécamp
- Sorquainville
- Thérouldeville
- Theuville-aux-Maillots
- Thiergeville
- Thiétreville
- Tourville-les-Ifs
- Toussaint
- Valmont
- Vattetot-sur-Mer
- Vinnemerville
- Yport
- Ypreville-Biville

== Population ==
Historical population
Year	Pop.	±% p.a.
2013	40,126	—
2018	39,027	−0.55%
Source: INSEE

== See also ==
- Arrondissements of the Seine-Maritime department
- Cantons of the Seine-Maritime department
- Communes of the Seine-Maritime department
