= Thérouldeville =

- Commune
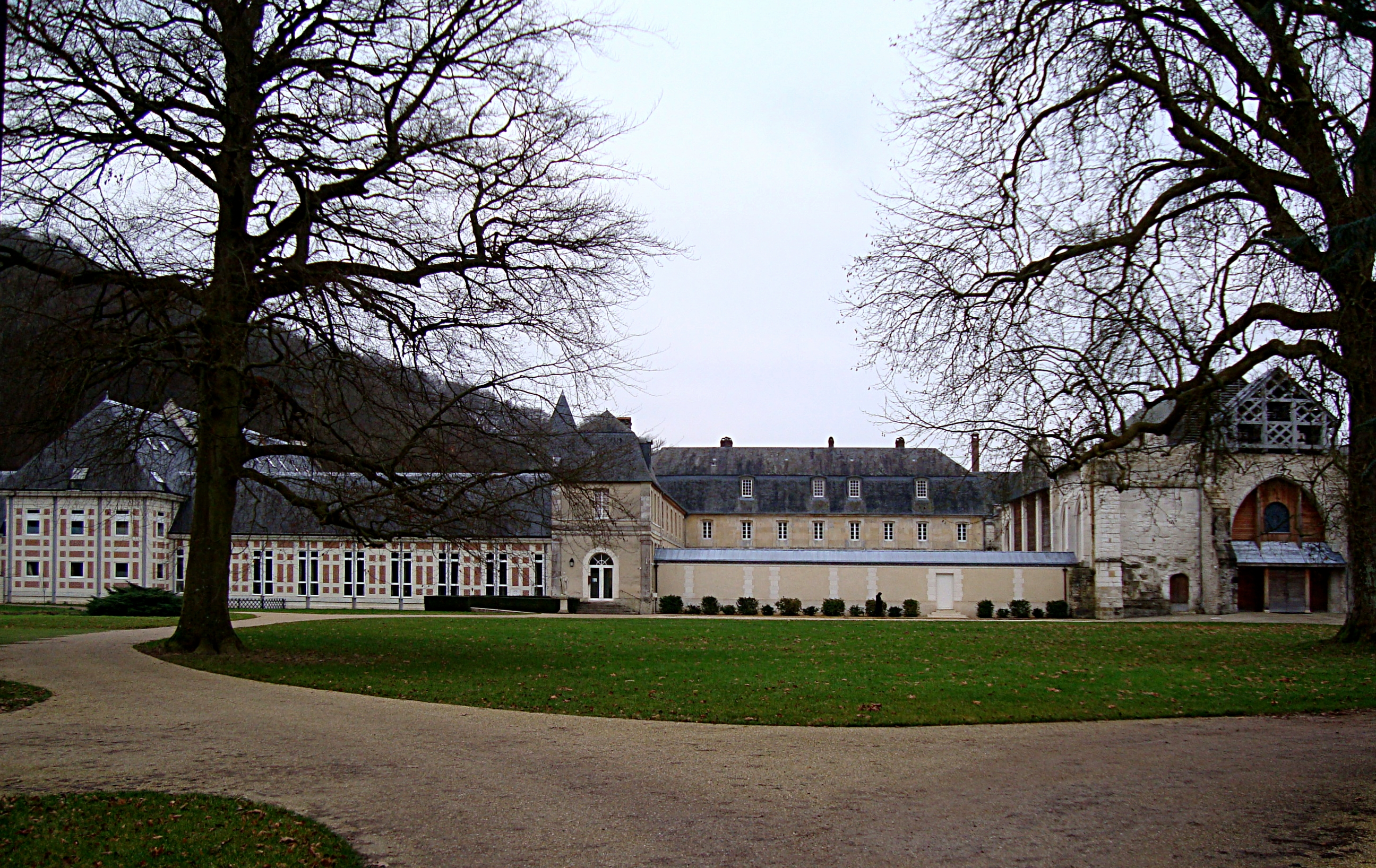
- The abbey in Valmont

- Coat of arms
- Location of Thérouldeville
- Location within France Location within Normandy
- Coordinates: 49°45′34″N 0°31′27″E
- Country: France
- Region: Normandy
- Department: Seine-Maritime
- Arrondissement: Le Havre
- Canton: Fécamp
- Intercommunality: CA Fécamp Caux Littoral

Government
  - Mayor (2026–32): Virginie Riviere
- Area^{1}: 4.58 km^{2} (1.77 sq mi)
- Elevation: 120 m (390 ft)
- Highest elevation: 131 m (430 ft)
- Lowest elevation: 54 m (177 ft)
- Population (2023): 664
  - Density: 145/km^{2} (375/sq mi)
- Time zone: UTC+01:00 (CET)
  - Summer (DST): UTC+02:00 (CEST)
- INSEE/Postal code: 76685 /76540
- ^{1} French Land Register data, which excludes lakes, ponds, glaciers > 1 km^{2} (0.386 sq mi or 247 acres) and river estuaries.

Thérouldeville (French pronunciation: [teʁuldəvil]) is a commune in the Seine-Maritime department in the Normandy region in northern France.

== Geography ==
Thérouldeville is a farming village in the woodland valley of the river Valmont in the Pays de Caux, situated some 29 miles (47 km) northeast of Le Havre, at the junction of the D33, D69 and D17 roads.

== Heraldry ==
Arms of Thérouldeville	The arms of Thérouldeville are blazoned : Vert, the local church in profile, door to dexter argent, a chief per pale 1: barry argent and gules, a lion sable crowned Or; and 2: gules, 2 swords in saltire Or.

== Population ==
Historical population
Year	Pop.	±% p.a.
1968	360	—
1975	292	−2.95%
1982	340	+2.20%
1990	423	+2.77%
1999	457	+0.86%
2007	520	+1.63%
2012	644	+4.37%
2017	664	+0.61%
2023	664	+0.00%
Source: INSEE

== Places of interest ==
- The church of St. Pierre and St. Paul, dating from the sixteenth century.
- The remains of Valmont Abbey.

== See also ==
- Communes of the Seine-Maritime department
