= Limpiville =

- Commune
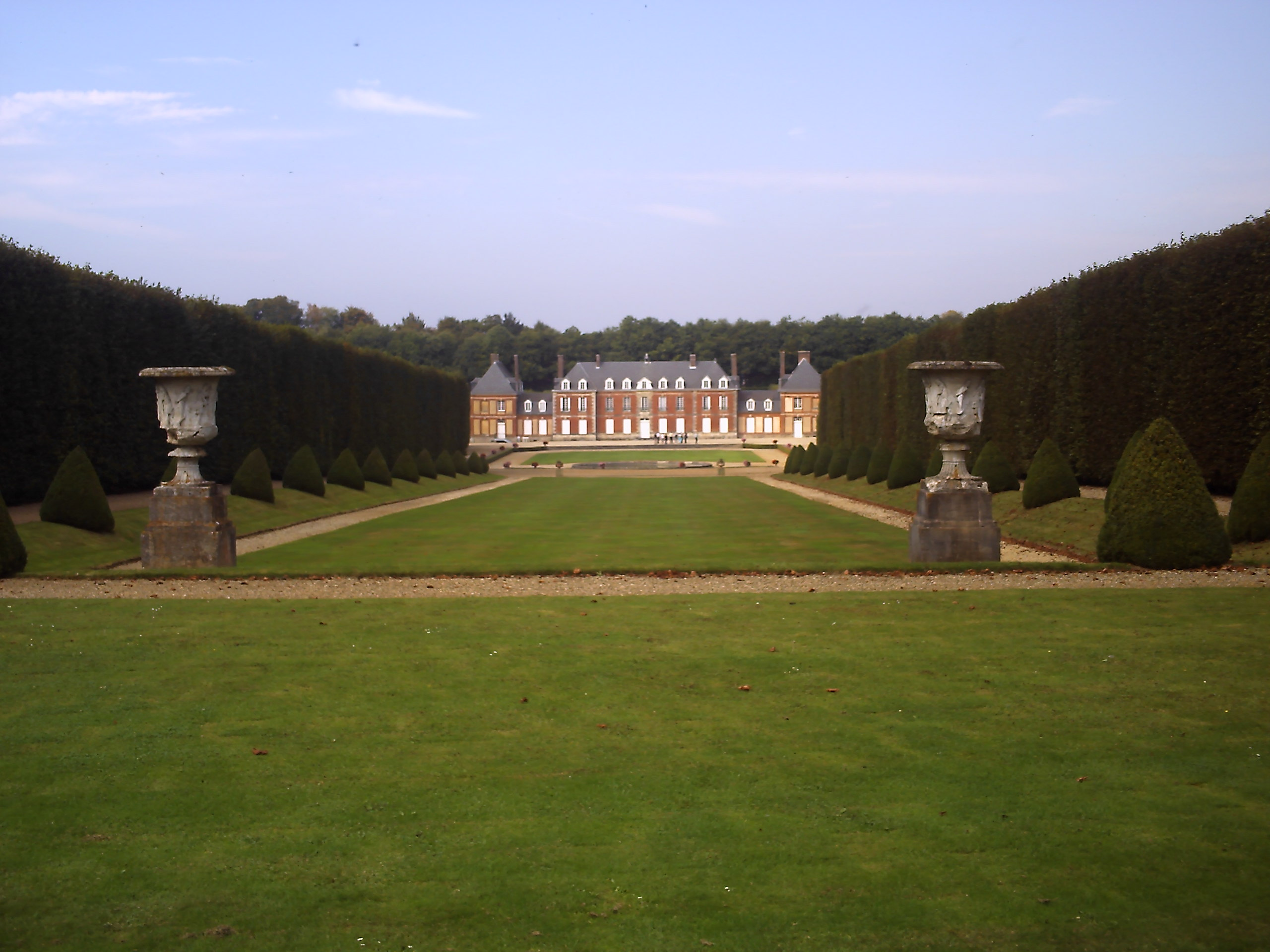
- The Château du Vaudroc
- Location of Limpiville
- Location within France Location within Normandy
- Coordinates: 49°41′26″N 0°30′13″E
- Country: France
- Region: Normandy
- Department: Seine-Maritime
- Arrondissement: Le Havre
- Canton: Fécamp
- Intercommunality: CA Fécamp Caux Littoral

Government
  - Mayor (2026–32): Régis Gosselin
- Area^{1}: 4.24 km^{2} (1.64 sq mi)
- Elevation: 120 m (390 ft)
- Highest elevation: 131 m (430 ft)
- Lowest elevation: 70 m (230 ft)
- Population (2023): 405
  - Density: 95.5/km^{2} (247/sq mi)
- Time zone: UTC+01:00 (CET)
  - Summer (DST): UTC+02:00 (CEST)
- INSEE/Postal code: 76386 /76540
- ^{1} French Land Register data, which excludes lakes, ponds, glaciers > 1 km^{2} (0.386 sq mi or 247 acres) and river estuaries.

Limpiville (French pronunciation: [lɛ̃pivil]) is a commune in the Seine-Maritime department in the Normandy region in northern France.

== Geography ==
A farming village in the Pays de Caux situated some 24 miles (39 km) northeast of Le Havre, between the D17 and D28 roads.

== Population ==
Historical population
Year	Pop.	±% p.a.
1968	324	—
1975	280	−2.06%
1982	276	−0.21%
1990	283	+0.31%
1999	340	+2.06%
2007	349	+0.33%
2012	348	−0.06%
2017	370	+1.23%
2023	405	+1.52%
Source: INSEE

== Places of interest ==
- The church of Notre-Dame, dating from the eighteenth century.
- The seventeenth century Château du Vaudroc.

== See also ==
- Communes of the Seine-Maritime department
