= Gerponville =

- Commune
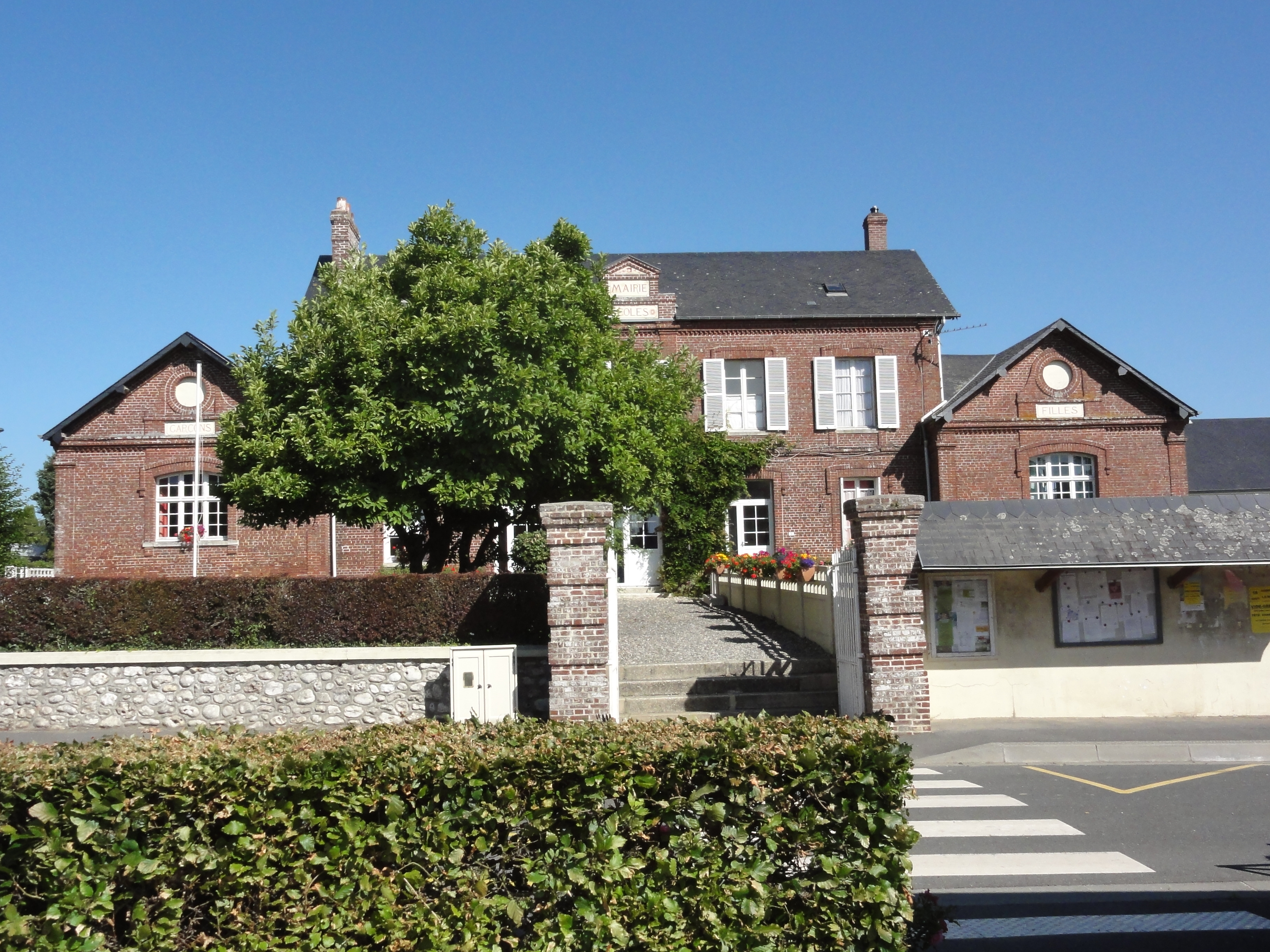
- Gerponville Town hall

- Coat of arms
- Location of Gerponville
- Location within France Location within Normandy
- Coordinates: 49°45′10″N 0°33′55″E
- Country: France
- Region: Normandy
- Department: Seine-Maritime
- Arrondissement: Le Havre
- Canton: Fécamp
- Intercommunality: CA Fécamp Caux Littoral

Government
  - Mayor (2020–2026): Marie-José Larcher-Dujardin
- Area^{1}: 4.91 km^{2} (1.90 sq mi)
- Elevation: 102 m (335 ft)
- Highest elevation: 132 m (433 ft)
- Lowest elevation: 75 m (246 ft)
- Population (2023): 397
  - Density: 80.9/km^{2} (209/sq mi)
- Time zone: UTC+01:00 (CET)
  - Summer (DST): UTC+02:00 (CEST)
- INSEE/Postal code: 76299 /76540
- ^{1} French Land Register data, which excludes lakes, ponds, glaciers > 1 km^{2} (0.386 sq mi or 247 acres) and river estuaries.

Gerponville (French pronunciation: [ʒɛʁpɔ̃vil]) is a commune in the Seine-Maritime department in the Normandy region in northern France.

== Geography ==
A farming village situated in the Pays de Caux, some 28 miles (45 km) northeast of Le Havre, near the junction of the D5 and D10 roads.

== Heraldry ==
Arms of Gerponville	The arms of Gerponville are blazoned : Or, a bend gules fretty argent, between a lion and a cock contourny, and on a chief azure, a cross potent Or between 2 banknotes argent.

== Population ==
Historical population
Year	Pop.	±% p.a.
1968	337	—
1975	334	−0.13%
1982	308	−1.15%
1990	330	+0.87%
1999	300	−1.05%
2007	342	+1.65%
2012	390	+2.66%
2017	398	+0.41%
2023	397	−0.04%
Source: INSEE

== Places of interest ==
- The church of Notre-Dame, dating from the twelfth century.
- The remains of an old manorhouse.

== See also ==
- Communes of the Seine-Maritime department
