= Toussaint, Seine-Maritime =

Toussaint
- Commune
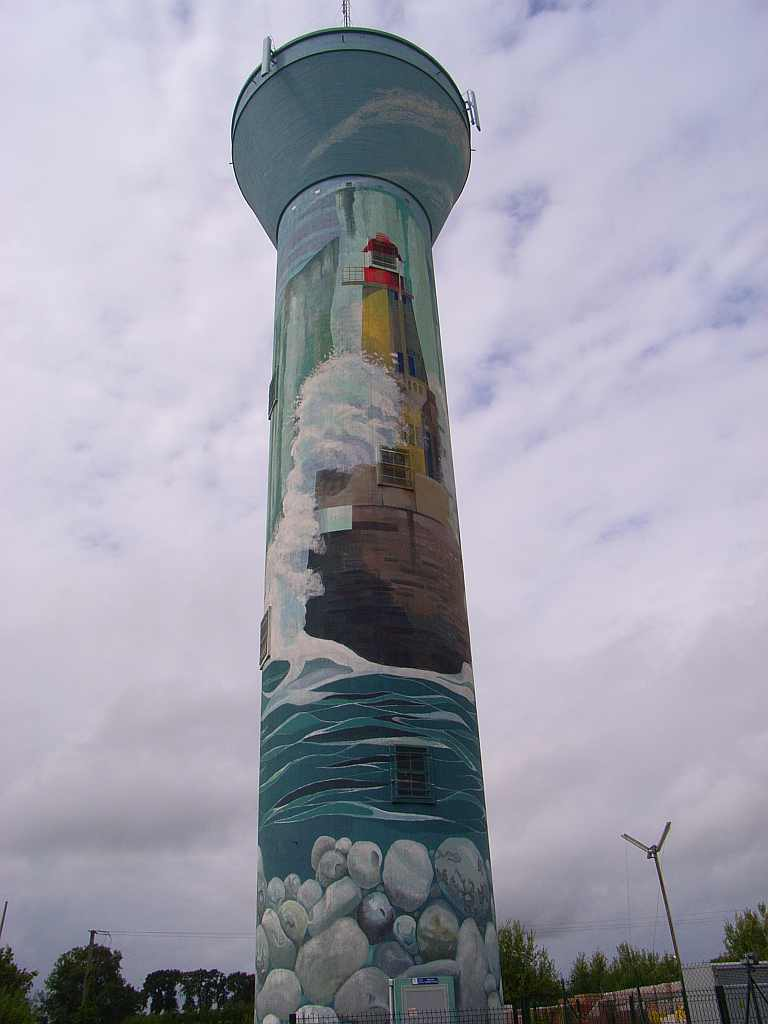
- The decorated watertower in Toussaint
- Location of Toussaint
- Location within France Location within Normandy
- Coordinates: 49°44′19″N 0°25′26″E
- Country: France
- Region: Normandy
- Department: Seine-Maritime
- Arrondissement: Le Havre
- Canton: Fécamp
- Intercommunality: CA Fécamp Caux Littoral

Government
  - Mayor (2026–32): Régis Haingue
- Area^{1}: 4.49 km^{2} (1.73 sq mi)
- Elevation: 109 m (358 ft)
- Highest elevation: 116 m (381 ft)
- Lowest elevation: 30 m (98 ft)
- Population (2023): 692
  - Density: 154/km^{2} (399/sq mi)
- Time zone: UTC+01:00 (CET)
  - Summer (DST): UTC+02:00 (CEST)
- INSEE/Postal code: 76708 /76400
- ^{1} French Land Register data, which excludes lakes, ponds, glaciers > 1 km^{2} (0.386 sq mi or 247 acres) and river estuaries.

Toussaint (French pronunciation: [tusɛ̃]) is a commune in the Seine-Maritime department in the Normandy region in northern France.

== Geography ==
A farming village in the Pays de Caux, situated some 23 miles (37 km) northeast of Le Havre, on the D926 road, the southern approach to Fecamp.

== Population ==
Historical population
Year	Pop.	±% p.a.
1968	384	—
1975	454	+2.42%
1982	743	+7.29%
1990	741	−0.03%
1999	679	−0.97%
2007	731	+0.93%
2012	759	+0.75%
2017	717	−1.13%
2023	692	−0.59%
Source: INSEE

== Places of interest ==
- The church of Notre-Dame, dating from the eleventh century.
- The sixteenth-century stone cross.
- Traces of a Celtic cemetery.
- A large camping site.

== See also ==
- Communes of the Seine-Maritime department
