= Sassetot-le-Mauconduit =

- Commune
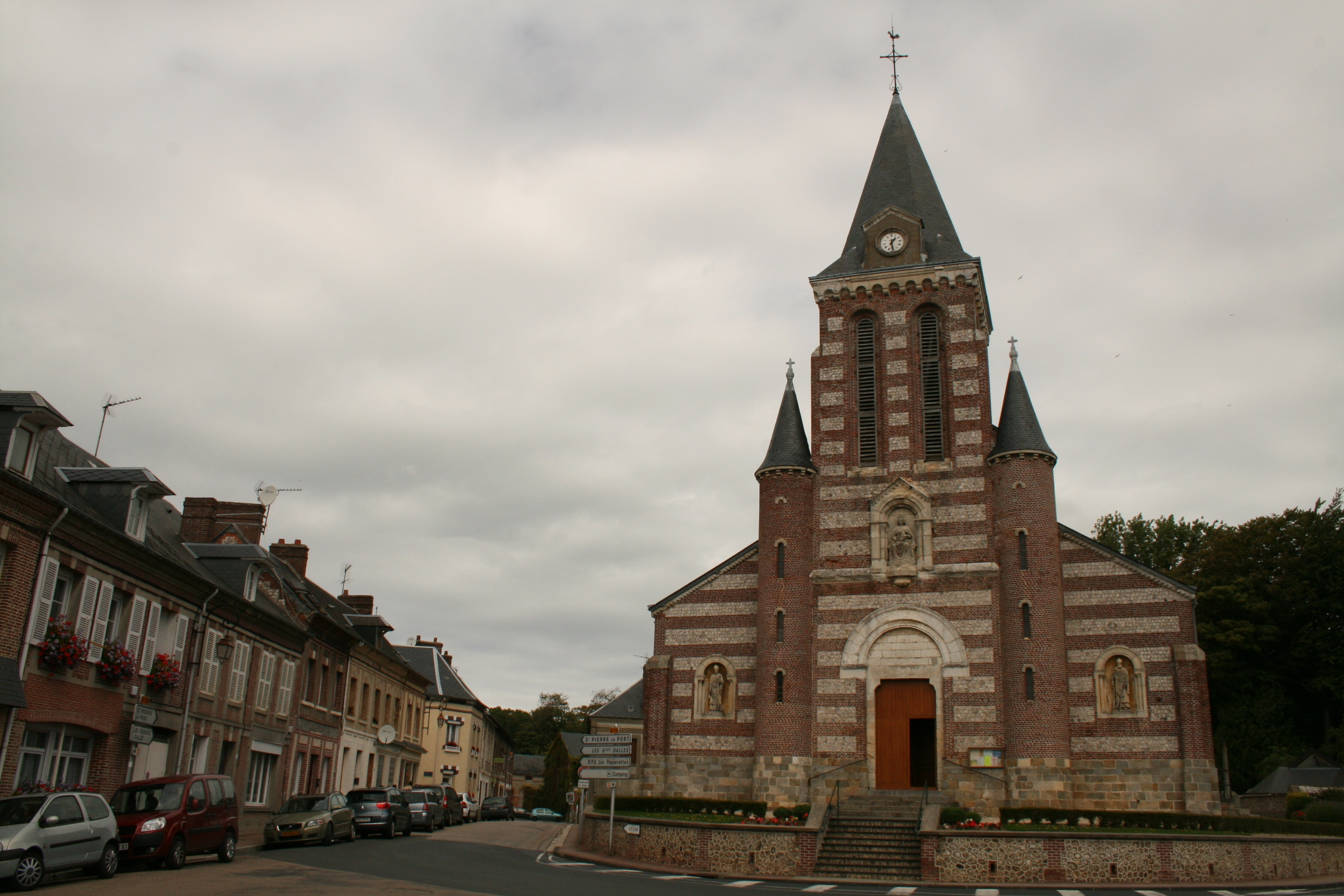
- The church in Sassetot-le-Mauconduit

- Coat of arms
- Location of Sassetot-le-Mauconduit
- Location within France Location within Normandy
- Coordinates: 49°48′16″N 0°31′45″E
- Country: France
- Region: Normandy
- Department: Seine-Maritime
- Arrondissement: Le Havre
- Canton: Fécamp
- Intercommunality: CA Fécamp Caux Littoral

Government
  - Mayor (2026–32): Eric Scarano
- Area^{1}: 8.81 km^{2} (3.40 sq mi)
- Elevation: 90 m (300 ft)
- Highest elevation: 104 m (341 ft)
- Lowest elevation: 0 m (0 ft)
- Population (2023): 997
  - Density: 113/km^{2} (293/sq mi)
- Time zone: UTC+01:00 (CET)
  - Summer (DST): UTC+02:00 (CEST)
- INSEE/Postal code: 76663 /76540
- ^{1} French Land Register data, which excludes lakes, ponds, glaciers > 1 km^{2} (0.386 sq mi or 247 acres) and river estuaries.

Sassetot-le-Mauconduit (French pronunciation: [sasto lə mokɔ̃dɥi]) is a commune in the Seine-Maritime department in the Normandy region in northern France.

== Geography ==
A farming village, by the coast of the English Channel, in the Pays de Caux, situated some 34 miles (55 km) northeast of Le Havre, at the junction of the D5 and D79 roads. The commune is sandwiched between two ‘’vallons’’, short valleys that create a gap in the huge cliffs, giving access to the sea via the pebble beach. The name comes from the Norman "Sax-Tot", meaning ‘’village of the Saxons". Mauconduit was the name of the 13th century seigneurs.

== Heraldry ==
Arms of Sassetot-le-Mauconduit	The arms of Sassetot-le-Mauconduit are blazoned : Or, a millrind between 4 crosslets, and on a chief azure 2 anchors Or.

== Population ==
Historical population
Year	Pop.	±% p.a.
1968	897	—
1975	749	−2.54%
1982	890	+2.49%
1990	944	+0.74%
1999	957	+0.15%
2007	923	−0.45%
2012	1,050	+2.61%
2017	1,100	+0.93%
2023	997	−1.63%
Source: INSEE

== Places of interest ==
- The church, dating from the nineteenth century.
- The eighteenth-century chateau and park of Sassetot
- The eighteenth-century chateau of Briquedalle
- The chateau of Criquemanville.
- Three chapels.
- The sixteenth-century stone cross in the cemetery.

== See also ==
- Communes of the Seine-Maritime department
