= Ypreville-Biville =

- Commune
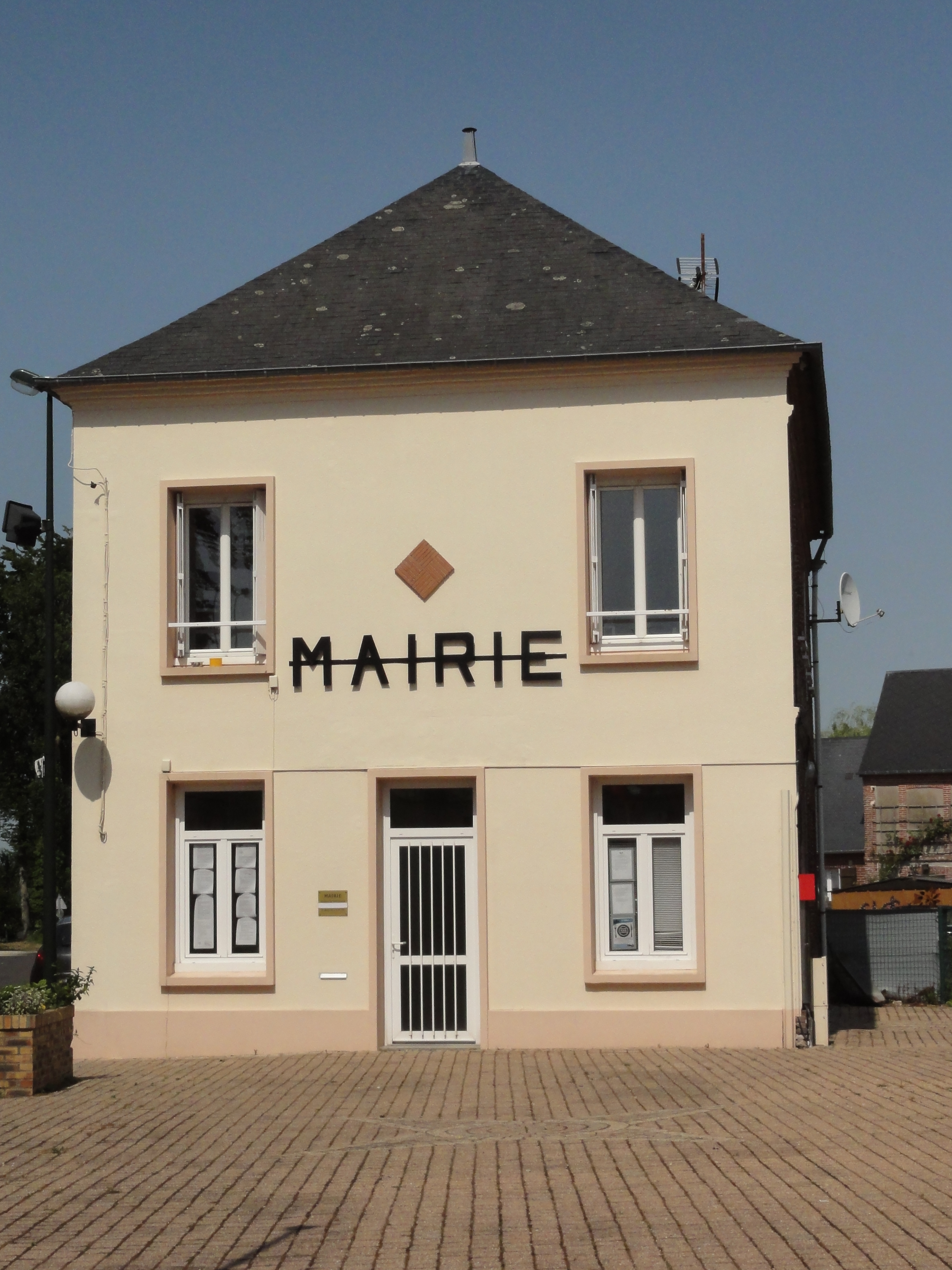
- Town hall

- Coat of arms
- Location of Ypreville-Biville
- Location within France Location within Normandy
- Coordinates: 49°41′41″N 0°32′03″E
- Country: France
- Region: Normandy
- Department: Seine-Maritime
- Arrondissement: Le Havre
- Canton: Fécamp
- Intercommunality: Fécamp Caux Littoral

Government
  - Mayor (2026–32): Amélie Dehais
- Area^{1}: 10.2 km^{2} (3.9 sq mi)
- Elevation: 126 m (413 ft)
- Highest elevation: 131 m (430 ft)
- Lowest elevation: 70 m (230 ft)
- Population (2023): 539
  - Density: 52.8/km^{2} (137/sq mi)
- Time zone: UTC+01:00 (CET)
  - Summer (DST): UTC+02:00 (CEST)
- INSEE/Postal code: 76755 /76540
- ^{1} French Land Register data, which excludes lakes, ponds, glaciers > 1 km^{2} (0.386 sq mi or 247 acres) and river estuaries.

Ypreville-Biville (French pronunciation: [ipʁəvil bivil]) is a commune in the Seine-Maritime department in the Normandy region in northern France.

== Geography ==
A farming village in the Pays de Caux, situated some 31 miles (50 km) northeast of Le Havre, at the junction of the D75 and D926 roads.

== Population ==
Historical population
Year	Pop.	±% p.a.
1968	409	—
1975	378	−1.12%
1982	432	+1.93%
1990	431	−0.03%
1999	451	+0.51%
2007	496	+1.20%
2012	565	+2.64%
2017	573	+0.28%
2023	539	−1.01%
Source: INSEE

== Places of interest ==
- The church of St. Michel, dating from the seventeenth century.
- The chateau de Biville.
- Ruins of an eleventh-century chapel at Biville.
- Fourteenth-century tombs in the cemetery.

== See also ==
- Communes of the Seine-Maritime department
