= Vinnemerville =

- Commune
- Location of Vinnemerville
- Location within France Location within Normandy
- Coordinates: 49°48′25″N 0°33′24″E
- Country: France
- Region: Normandy
- Department: Seine-Maritime
- Arrondissement: Le Havre
- Canton: Fécamp
- Intercommunality: CC Côte d'Albâtre

Government
  - Mayor (2026–32): Laurent Boucher-Noel
- Area^{1}: 4.22 km^{2} (1.63 sq mi)
- Elevation: 88 m (289 ft)
- Highest elevation: 96 m (315 ft)
- Lowest elevation: 35 m (115 ft)
- Population (2023): 217
  - Density: 51.4/km^{2} (133/sq mi)
- Time zone: UTC+01:00 (CET)
  - Summer (DST): UTC+02:00 (CEST)
- INSEE/Postal code: 76746 /76540
- ^{1} French Land Register data, which excludes lakes, ponds, glaciers > 1 km^{2} (0.386 sq mi or 247 acres) and river estuaries.

Vinnemerville (French pronunciation: [vinmɛʁvil]) is a commune in the Seine-Maritime department in the Normandy region in northern France.

== Geography ==
A small farming village in the Pays de Caux, situated some 35 miles (56 km) northeast of Le Havre, on the D471 road.

== Population ==
Historical population
| Year | Pop. | ±% p.a. |
|---|---|---|
| 1968 | 188 | — |
| 1975 | 160 | −2.28% |
| 1982 | 203 | +3.46% |
| 1990 | 196 | −0.44% |
| 1999 | 211 | +0.82% |
| 2007 | 209 | −0.12% |
| 2012 | 217 | +0.75% |
| 2017 | 216 | −0.09% |
| 2023 | 217 | +0.08% |
Source: INSEE

== Places of interest ==
- The church of Notre-Dame, dating from the eleventh century.
- A seventeenth-century fortified manorhouse.

== See also ==
- Communes of the Seine-Maritime department
