= Saint-Pierre-en-Port =

- Commune
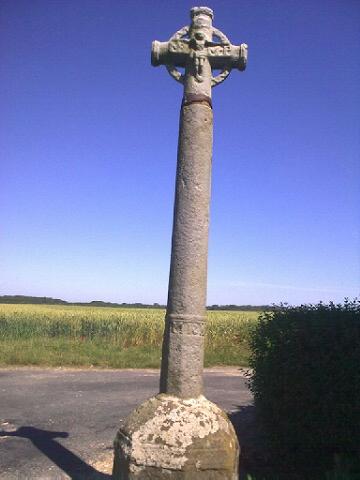
- The cross at the entrance to Saint-Pierre-en-Port
- Location of Saint-Pierre-en-Port
- Location within France Location within Normandy
- Coordinates: 49°48′26″N 0°29′49″E
- Country: France
- Region: Normandy
- Department: Seine-Maritime
- Arrondissement: Le Havre
- Canton: Fécamp
- Intercommunality: CA Fécamp Caux Littoral

Government
  - Mayor (2026–32): Joël Trépied
- Area^{1}: 3.89 km^{2} (1.50 sq mi)
- Elevation: 100 m (330 ft)
- Highest elevation: 96 m (315 ft)
- Lowest elevation: 0 m (0 ft)
- Population (2023): 826
  - Density: 212/km^{2} (550/sq mi)
- Time zone: UTC+01:00 (CET)
  - Summer (DST): UTC+02:00 (CEST)
- INSEE/Postal code: 76637 /76540
- ^{1} French Land Register data, which excludes lakes, ponds, glaciers > 1 km^{2} (0.386 sq mi or 247 acres) and river estuaries.

Saint-Pierre-en-Port (French pronunciation: [sɛ̃ pjɛʁ ɑ̃ pɔʁ]) is a commune in the Seine-Maritime department in the Normandy region in northern France.

== Geography ==
A farming village in the Pays de Caux, situated some 31 miles (50 km) northeast of Le Havre, at the junction of the D33 and D79 roads. The commune has a pebble beach and some very high limestone cliffs overlooking the English Channel.

== History ==
Several polished stone axes were discovered here in the 19th century, evidence of human presence in the Neolithic period (9000 to 3300 years BC). In 1970, archaeological excavations found sarcophagi of the Merovingian period (500 to 750 AD).
In the 13th century, a church was built on the site of the old cemetery. At the same time, the chapel of Saint-Gervais was built on the plateau at Boulleville (near the present-day water tower). This was destroyed in a fire in the early 18th century.
In the early 19th century, the population of the valley began a slow migration inland and away from the sea. Fires and storms regularly destroyed the modest homes of the fishing families. The growth of fishing in Newfoundland also took sailors away from the village to spend 9 months at sea.
In 1846, the mayor (the Count de Trémauville) built the town hall and a boys’ school. Three years later, he demolished the old church and cemetery, citing the lack of maintenance and very poor condition and undertook the reconstruction of the church, saving only a part of the porch of the old building.
Forty years later, like many communes in the region, Saint-Pierre welcomed tourism by those wishing to spend their leisure time by the sea. On the hillsides, where herds of grazing sheep once roamed, second homes were springing up out of the land. This in turn led to the village developing, with more shops, handicrafts, agriculture, the revival of inshore fishing and some cultural events. Around this time, in 1883, the Grand Hotel des Terrasses and the casino were built. They were destroyed in 1944 by the Germans.

== Population ==
Historical population
Year	Pop.	±% p.a.
1968	922	—
1975	856	−1.06%
1982	853	−0.05%
1990	832	−0.31%
1999	802	−0.41%
2007	829	+0.41%
2012	842	+0.31%
2017	831	−0.26%
2023	826	−0.10%
Source: INSEE

== Places of interest ==
- The 19th-century church of St. Pierre, with a small part dating from the 13th century.

== See also ==
- Communes of the Seine-Maritime department
