= Écretteville-sur-Mer =

- Commune
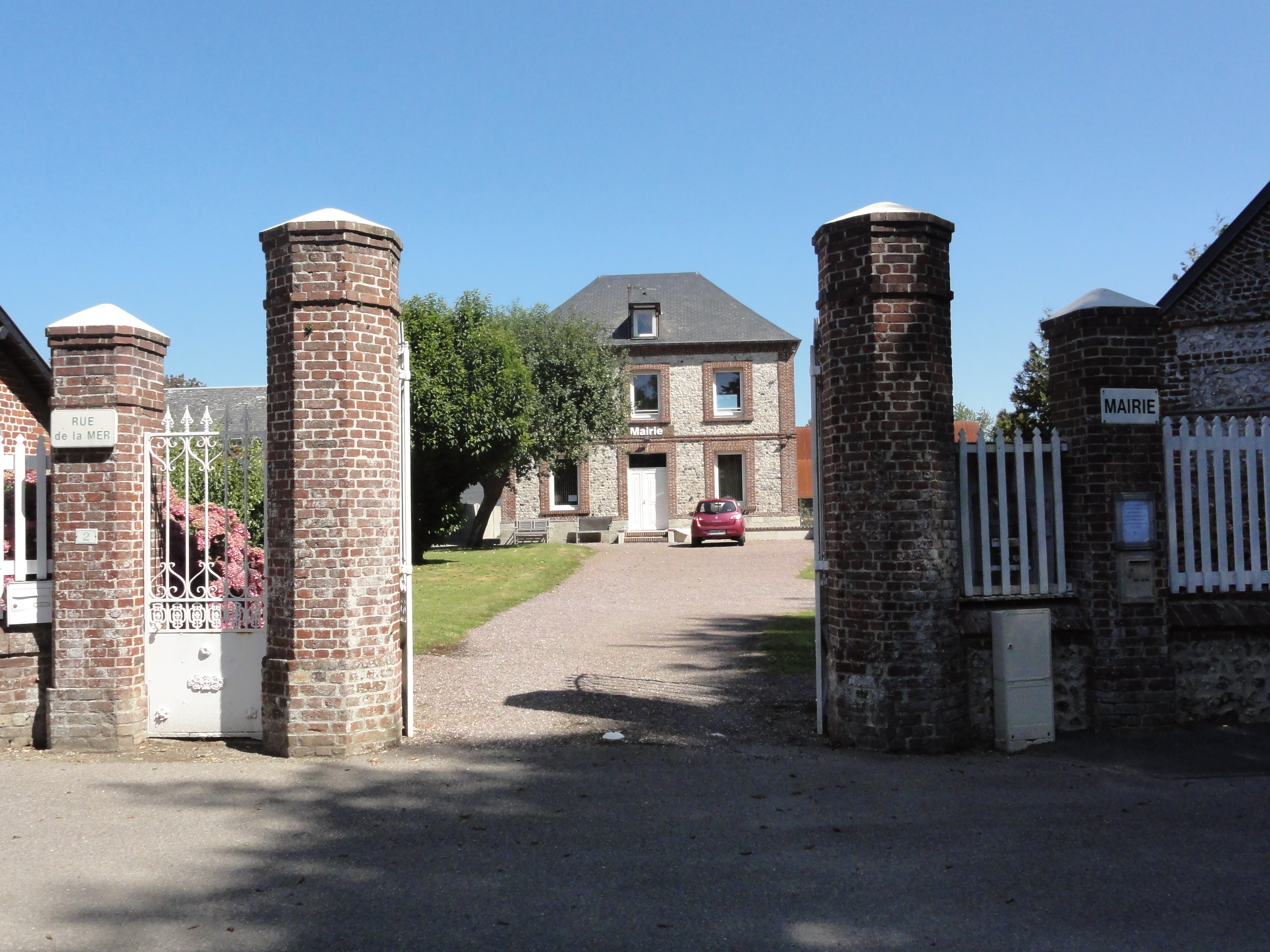
- Écretteville-sur-Mer town hall
- Location of Écretteville-sur-Mer
- Location within France Location within Normandy
- Coordinates: 49°47′33″N 0°29′10″E
- Country: France
- Region: Normandy
- Department: Seine-Maritime
- Arrondissement: Le Havre
- Canton: Fécamp
- Intercommunality: CA Fécamp Caux Littoral

Government
  - Mayor (2020–2026): Yannick Mouiche
- Area^{1}: 1.89 km^{2} (0.73 sq mi)
- Elevation: 100 m (330 ft)
- Highest elevation: 106 m (348 ft)
- Lowest elevation: 30 m (98 ft)
- Population (2023): 140
  - Density: 74/km^{2} (190/sq mi)
- Time zone: UTC+01:00 (CET)
  - Summer (DST): UTC+02:00 (CEST)
- INSEE/Postal code: 76226 /76540
- ^{1} French Land Register data, which excludes lakes, ponds, glaciers > 1 km^{2} (0.386 sq mi or 247 acres) and river estuaries.

Écretteville-sur-Mer (French pronunciation: [ekʁɛtvil syʁ mɛʁ], literally Écretteville on Sea) is a commune in the Seine-Maritime department in the Normandy region in northern France.

== Geography ==
A very small farming village in the Pays de Caux, situated some 32 miles (51 km) northeast of Le Havre, just by the D79 road.

== Population ==
Historical population
Year	Pop.	±% p.a.
1968	68	—
1975	60	−1.77%
1982	62	+0.47%
1990	85	+4.02%
1999	93	+1.00%
2007	105	+1.53%
2012	156	+8.24%
2017	159	+0.38%
2023	140	−2.10%
Source: INSEE

== Places of interest ==
- The church of St.Martin, dating from the twelfth century.
- A thirteenth-century stone cross.

== See also ==
- Communes of the Seine-Maritime department
