= Thiergeville =

- Commune
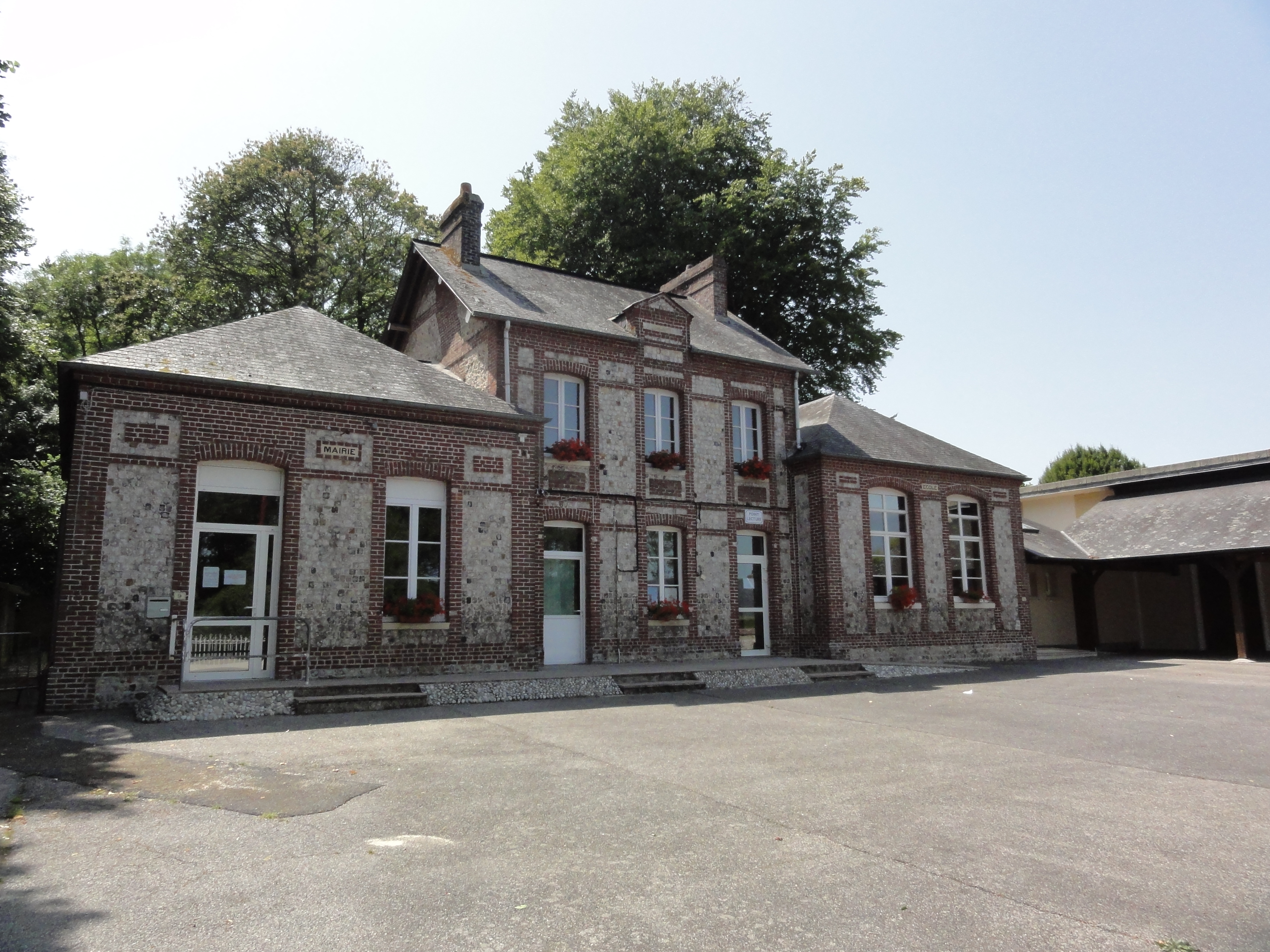
- Town hall

- Coat of arms
- Location of Thiergeville
- Location within France Location within Normandy
- Coordinates: 49°43′14″N 0°29′43″E
- Country: France
- Region: Normandy
- Department: Seine-Maritime
- Arrondissement: Le Havre
- Canton: Fécamp
- Intercommunality: CA Fécamp Caux Littoral

Government
  - Mayor (2026–32): Philippe Durand
- Area^{1}: 9.25 km^{2} (3.57 sq mi)
- Elevation: 120 m (390 ft)
- Highest elevation: 132 m (433 ft)
- Lowest elevation: 44 m (144 ft)
- Population (2023): 397
  - Density: 42.9/km^{2} (111/sq mi)
- Time zone: UTC+01:00 (CET)
  - Summer (DST): UTC+02:00 (CEST)
- INSEE/Postal code: 76688 /76540
- ^{1} French Land Register data, which excludes lakes, ponds, glaciers > 1 km^{2} (0.386 sq mi or 247 acres) and river estuaries.

Thiergeville (French pronunciation: [tjɛʁʒəvil]) is a commune in the Seine-Maritime department in the Normandy region in northern France.

== Geography ==
A farming village in the Pays de Caux, situated some 27 miles (43 km) northeast of Le Havre, at the junction of the D17 and D69 roads.

== Population ==
Historical population
Year	Pop.	±% p.a.
1968	308	—
1975	272	−1.76%
1982	257	−0.81%
1990	279	+1.03%
1999	293	+0.55%
2007	343	+1.99%
2012	398	+3.02%
2017	406	+0.40%
2023	397	−0.37%
Source: INSEE

== Places of interest ==
- The church of St. Martin, dating from the eighteenth century.
- Two chateaus.
- The motte of a feudal castle.

== See also ==
- Communes of the Seine-Maritime department
