= Contremoulins =

- Commune
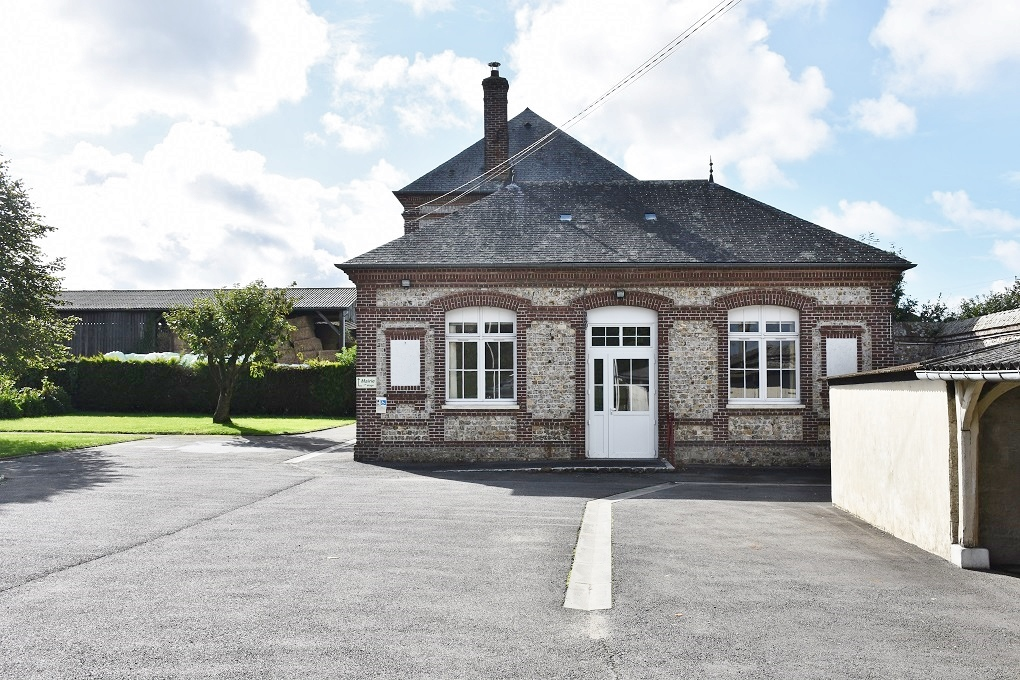
- The town hall in Contremoulins

- Coat of arms
- Location of Contremoulins
- Location within France Location within Normandy
- Coordinates: 49°43′36″N 0°25′41″E
- Country: France
- Region: Normandy
- Department: Seine-Maritime
- Arrondissement: Le Havre
- Canton: Fécamp
- Intercommunality: CA Fécamp Caux Littoral

Government
  - Mayor (2026–32): Gérard Colombel
- Area^{1}: 4.38 km^{2} (1.69 sq mi)
- Elevation: 110 m (360 ft)
- Highest elevation: 127 m (417 ft)
- Lowest elevation: 27 m (89 ft)
- Population (2023): 167
  - Density: 38.1/km^{2} (98.8/sq mi)
- Time zone: UTC+01:00 (CET)
  - Summer (DST): UTC+02:00 (CEST)
- INSEE/Postal code: 76187 /76400
- ^{1} French Land Register data, which excludes lakes, ponds, glaciers > 1 km^{2} (0.386 sq mi or 247 acres) and river estuaries.

Contremoulins (French pronunciation: [kɔ̃tʁəmulɛ̃]) is a commune in the Seine-Maritime department in the Normandy region in northern France.

== Geography ==
A small farming village, surrounded on 3 sides by woodland, situated in the Pays de Caux, some 26 miles (42 km) northeast of Le Havre, at the junction of the D68 and D926 roads.

== Population ==
Historical population
Year	Pop.	±% p.a.
1968	151	—
1975	165	+1.27%
1982	176	+0.93%
1990	231	+3.46%
1999	208	−1.16%
2007	200	−0.49%
2012	189	−1.13%
2017	155	−3.89%
2023	167	+1.25%
Source: INSEE

== Places of interest ==
- The eighteenth century ruined château of Franqueville.
- The château de Gruville.
- The church of St.Martin, dating from the seventeenth century.

== See also ==
- Communes of the Seine-Maritime department
