= Thiétreville =

- Commune
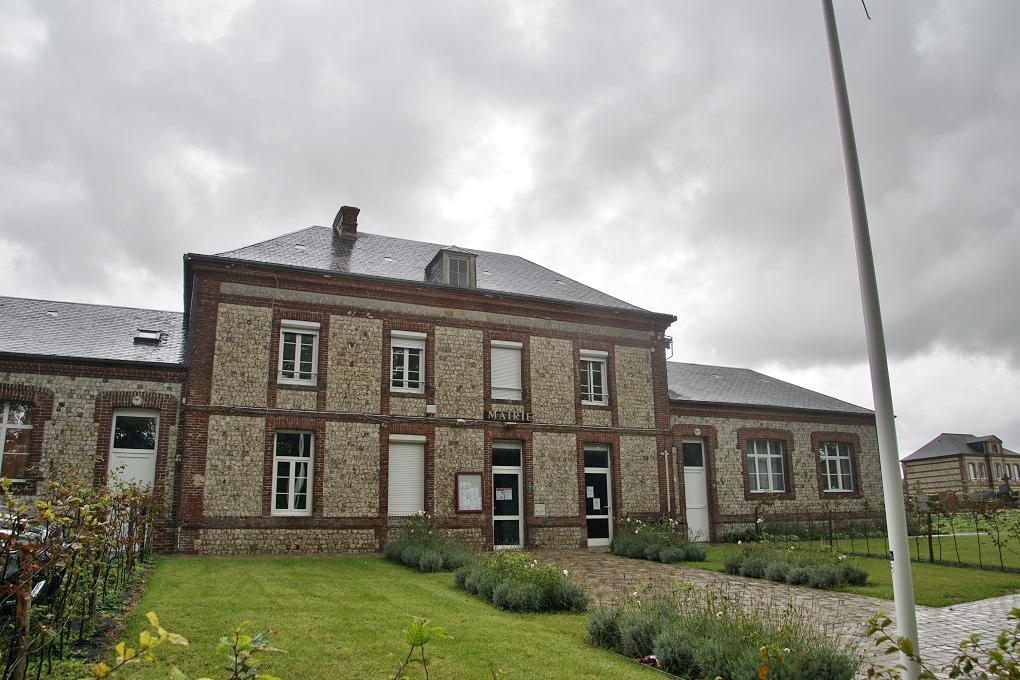
- Town hall

- Coat of arms
- Location of Thiétreville
- Location within France Location within Normandy
- Coordinates: 49°43′00″N 0°30′55″E
- Country: France
- Region: Normandy
- Department: Seine-Maritime
- Arrondissement: Le Havre
- Canton: Fécamp
- Intercommunality: CA Fécamp Caux Littoral

Government
  - Mayor (2026–32): Nicole Gelebart
- Area^{1}: 5.33 km^{2} (2.06 sq mi)
- Elevation: 125 m (410 ft)
- Highest elevation: 129 m (423 ft)
- Lowest elevation: 62 m (203 ft)
- Population (2023): 378
  - Density: 70.9/km^{2} (184/sq mi)
- Time zone: UTC+01:00 (CET)
  - Summer (DST): UTC+02:00 (CEST)
- INSEE/Postal code: 76689 /76540
- ^{1} French Land Register data, which excludes lakes, ponds, glaciers > 1 km^{2} (0.386 sq mi or 247 acres) and river estuaries.

Thiétreville (French pronunciation: [tjetʁəvil]) is a commune in the Seine-Maritime department in the Normandy region in northern France.

== Geography ==
A farming village in the Pays de Caux, situated some 27 miles (43 km) northeast of Le Havre, between the D271 and D17 roads.

== Heraldry ==
Arms of Thiétreville	The arms of Thiétreville are blazoned : Quarterly 1: Azure, a bell-tower argent roofed sable; 2: Or, a trefoil vert; 3: Or, a rose gules; 4: Azure, a plate [argent].

== Population ==
Historical population
Year	Pop.	±% p.a.
1968	369	—
1975	355	−0.55%
1982	361	+0.24%
1990	355	−0.21%
1999	356	+0.03%
2007	344	−0.43%
2012	385	+2.28%
2017	371	−0.74%
2023	378	+0.31%
Source: INSEE

== Places of interest ==
- The church of St. Martin and St. Eloi, dating from the seventeenth century.
- A seventeenth-century stone cross.

== See also ==
- Communes of the Seine-Maritime department
