= Riville =

- Commune
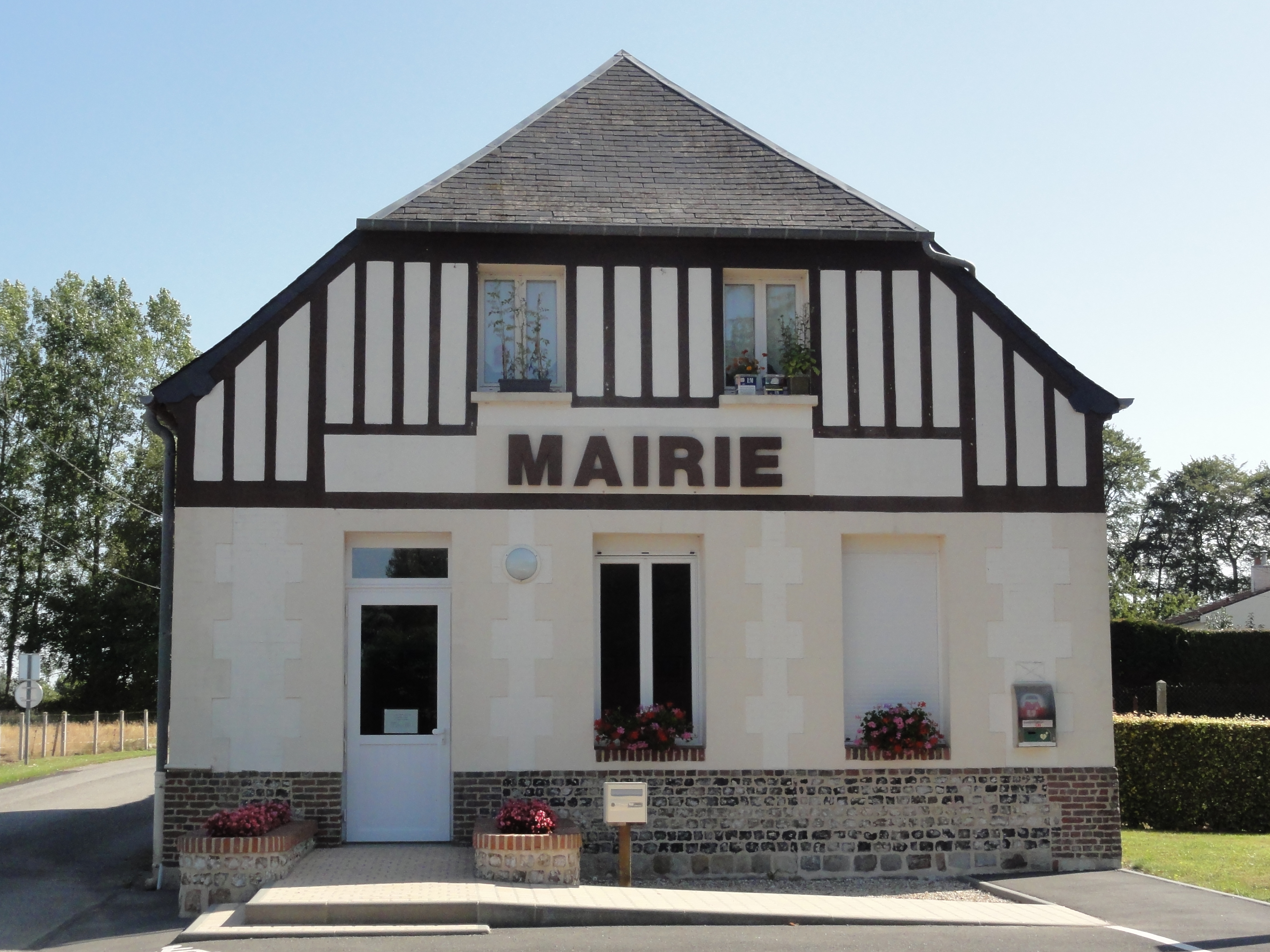
- Town hall
- Location of Riville
- Location within France Location within Normandy
- Coordinates: 49°43′37″N 0°33′45″E
- Country: France
- Region: Normandy
- Department: Seine-Maritime
- Arrondissement: Le Havre
- Canton: Fécamp
- Intercommunality: CA Fécamp Caux Littoral

Government
  - Mayor (2020–2026): Joël Freger
- Area^{1}: 7.44 km^{2} (2.87 sq mi)
- Elevation: 130 m (430 ft)
- Highest elevation: 134 m (440 ft)
- Lowest elevation: 70 m (230 ft)
- Population (2023): 313
  - Density: 42.1/km^{2} (109/sq mi)
- Time zone: UTC+01:00 (CET)
  - Summer (DST): UTC+02:00 (CEST)
- INSEE/Postal code: 76529 /76540
- ^{1} French Land Register data, which excludes lakes, ponds, glaciers > 1 km^{2} (0.386 sq mi or 247 acres) and river estuaries.

Riville (French pronunciation: [ʁivil]) is a commune in the Seine-Maritime department in the Normandy region in northern France.

== Geography ==
A small farming village in the Pays de Caux, situated some 30 miles (48 km) northeast of Le Havre, at the junction of the D28 and D75 roads.

== Population ==
Historical population
Year	Pop.	±% p.a.
1968	271	—
1975	268	−0.16%
1982	261	−0.38%
1990	280	+0.88%
1999	253	−1.12%
2007	291	+1.76%
2012	327	+2.36%
2017	293	−2.17%
2023	313	+1.11%
Source: INSEE

== Places of interest ==
- The church of St. Pierre, dating from the eighteenth century.
- An old chapel.
- A farmhouse built on the old monastic manorhouse.

== See also ==
- Communes of the Seine-Maritime department
