= Colleville, Seine-Maritime =

Colleville
- Commune
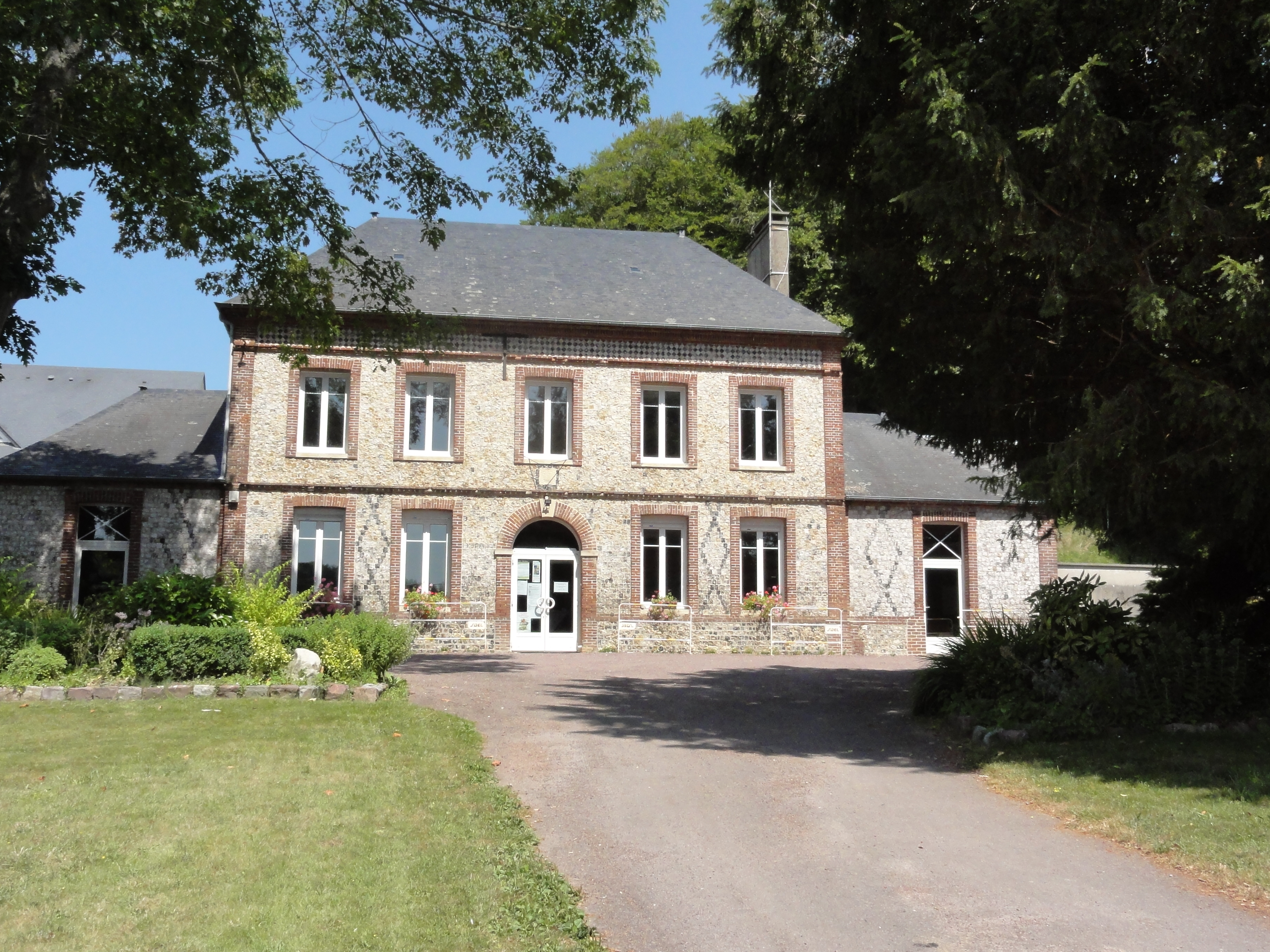
- The town hall in Colleville

- Coat of arms
- Location of Colleville
- Location within France Location within Normandy
- Coordinates: 49°44′59″N 0°27′08″E
- Country: France
- Region: Normandy
- Department: Seine-Maritime
- Arrondissement: Le Havre
- Canton: Fécamp
- Intercommunality: CA Fécamp Caux Littoral

Government
  - Mayor (2026–32): Thierry Duprey
- Area^{1}: 7.39 km^{2} (2.85 sq mi)
- Elevation: 108 m (354 ft)
- Highest elevation: 124 m (407 ft)
- Lowest elevation: 17 m (56 ft)
- Population (2023): 746
  - Density: 101/km^{2} (261/sq mi)
- Time zone: UTC+01:00 (CET)
  - Summer (DST): UTC+02:00 (CEST)
- INSEE/Postal code: 76183 /76400
- ^{1} French Land Register data, which excludes lakes, ponds, glaciers > 1 km^{2} (0.386 sq mi or 247 acres) and river estuaries.

Colleville (French pronunciation: [kɔlvil]) is a commune in the Seine-Maritime department in the Normandy region in northern France.

== Geography ==
A farming and light industrial village situated in the wooded valley of the river Valmont and the Pays de Caux, some 25 miles (40 km) northeast of Le Havre, at the junction of the D68 and D28 roads.

== Population ==
Historical population
Year	Pop.	±% p.a.
1968	490	—
1975	492	+0.06%
1982	594	+2.73%
1990	671	+1.54%
1999	703	+0.52%
2007	692	−0.20%
2012	754	+1.73%
2017	759	+0.13%
2023	746	−0.29%
Source: INSEE

== Places of interest ==
- The church of St.Martin, dating from the nineteenth century.
- Some prehistoric and Gallo-Roman remains.
- The sixteenth century château d'Hongerville.

== See also ==
- Communes of the Seine-Maritime department
