= Theuville-aux-Maillots =

- Commune
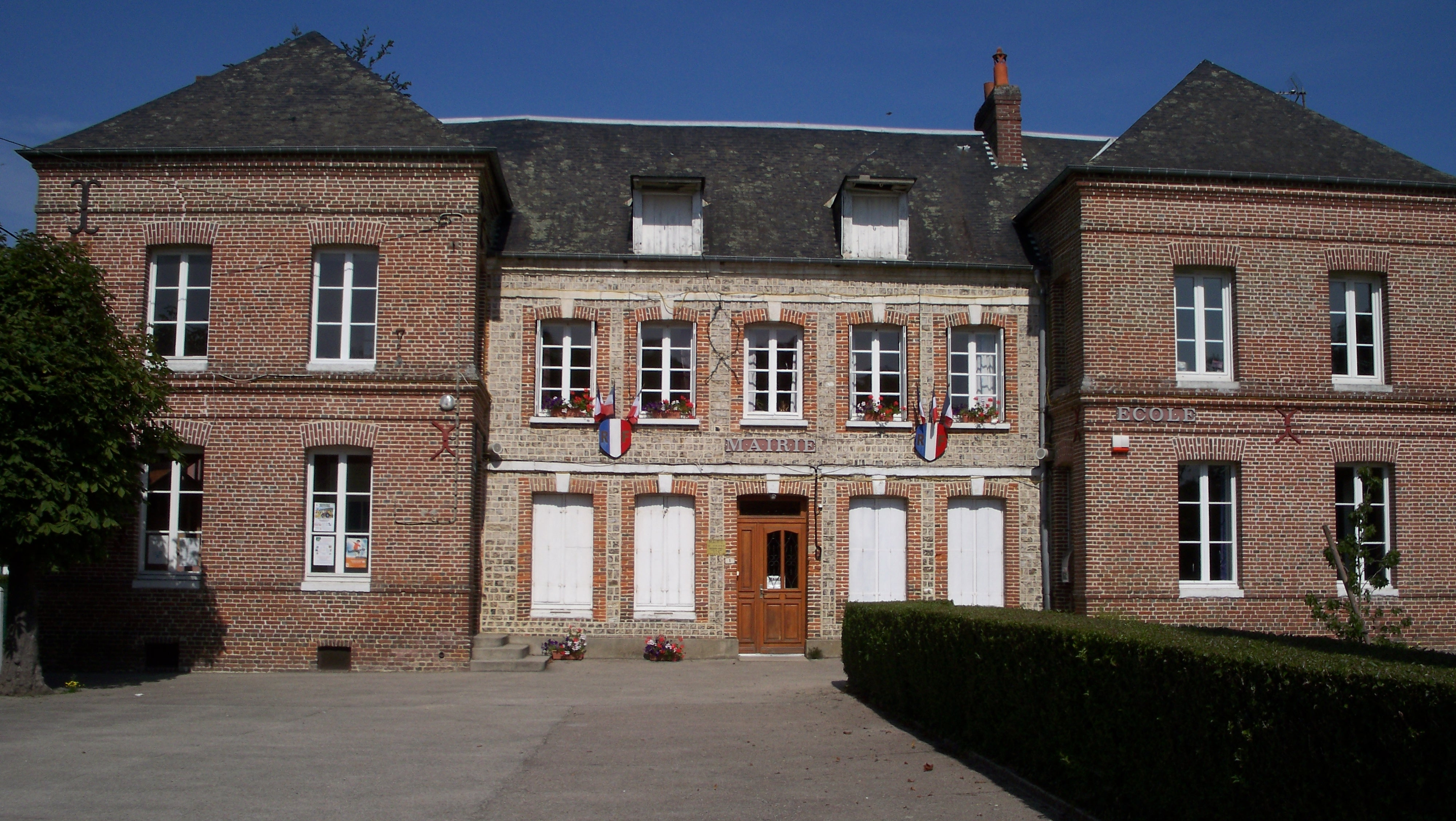
- The town hall

- Coat of arms
- Location of Theuville-aux-Maillots
- Location within France Location within Normandy
- Coordinates: 49°45′58″N 0°32′42″E
- Country: France
- Region: Normandy
- Department: Seine-Maritime
- Arrondissement: Le Havre
- Canton: Fécamp
- Intercommunality: CA Fécamp Caux Littoral

Government
  - Mayor (2026–32): Thérèse Affagard
- Area^{1}: 7.24 km^{2} (2.80 sq mi)
- Elevation: 112 m (367 ft)
- Highest elevation: 132 m (433 ft)
- Lowest elevation: 58 m (190 ft)
- Population (2023): 520
  - Density: 72/km^{2} (190/sq mi)
- Time zone: UTC+01:00 (CET)
  - Summer (DST): UTC+02:00 (CEST)
- INSEE/Postal code: 76686 /76540
- ^{1} French Land Register data, which excludes lakes, ponds, glaciers > 1 km^{2} (0.386 sq mi or 247 acres) and river estuaries.

Theuville-aux-Maillots (French pronunciation: [tøvil o majo]) is a commune in the Seine-Maritime department in the Normandy region in north-western France.

== Geography ==
A farming village in the Pays de Caux, situated some 31 miles (50 km) northeast of Le Havre, at the junction of the D 5 and D 69 roads.

== Heraldry ==
Arms of Theuville-aux-Maillots	The arms of Theuville-aux-Maillots are blazoned : Argent, an oak eradicated vert, and on a chief azure, 2 stalks of wheat in saltire Or.

== Population ==
Historical population

Year	Pop.	±% p.a.
1793	812	—
1800	849	+0.64%
1806	891	+0.81%
1821	919	+0.21%
1831	995	+0.80%
1836	1,027	+0.64%
1841	1,016	−0.22%
1846	964	−1.05%
1851	972	+0.17%
1856	908	−1.35%
1861	907	−0.02%
1866	885	−0.49%
1872	885	+0.00%
1876	834	−1.47%
1881	766	−1.69%
1886	774	+0.21%
1891	756	−0.47%
1896	677	−2.18%
1901	686	+0.26%

Year	Pop.	±% p.a.
1906	641	−1.35%
1911	613	−0.89%
1921	517	−1.69%
1926	509	−0.31%
1931	504	−0.20%
1936	505	+0.04%
1946	574	+1.29%
1954	529	−1.02%
1962	518	−0.26%
1968	470	−1.61%
1975	423	−1.49%
1982	411	−0.41%
1990	416	+0.15%
1999	378	−1.06%
2007	445	+2.06%
2012	508	+2.68%
2017	554	+1.75%
2023	520	−1.05%

Source: EHESS and INSEE (1968-2023)

== Places of interest ==
- The church of St. Maclou and St. Eutrope, dating from the eighteenth century.
- A chateau dating from the sixteenth century.

== See also ==
- Communes of the Seine-Maritime department
