= Angerville-la-Martel =

- Commune
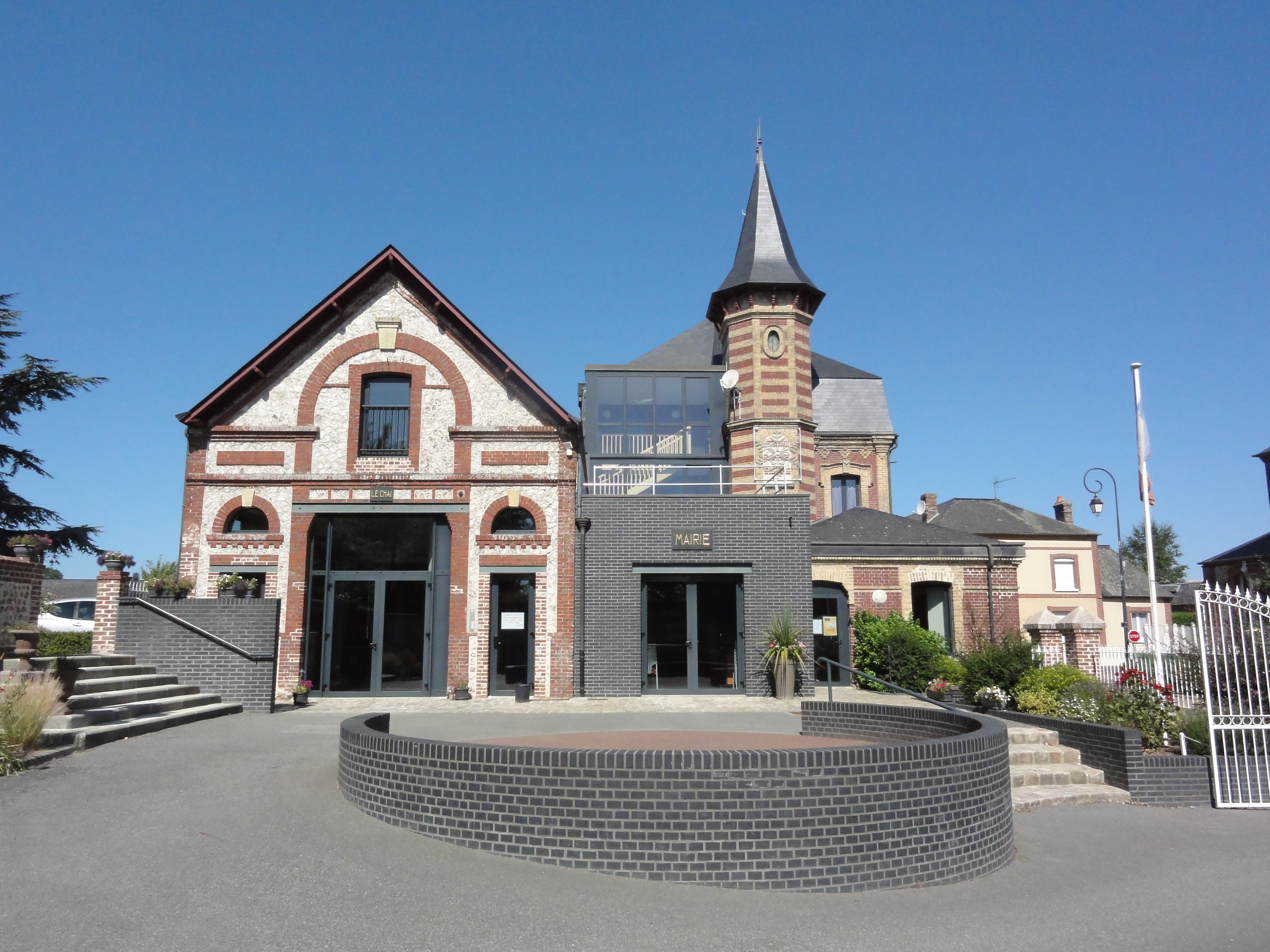
- Town hall
- Location of Angerville-la-Martel
- Location within France Location within Normandy
- Coordinates: 49°45′45″N 0°30′09″E
- Country: France
- Region: Normandy
- Department: Seine-Maritime
- Arrondissement: Le Havre
- Canton: Fécamp
- Intercommunality: Fécamp Caux Littoral

Government
  - Mayor (2026–32): Laurent Vasset
- Area^{1}: 10.19 km^{2} (3.93 sq mi)
- Elevation: 126 m (413 ft)
- Highest elevation: 126 m (413 ft)
- Lowest elevation: 75 m (246 ft)
- Population (2023): 1,079
  - Density: 105.9/km^{2} (274.2/sq mi)
- Time zone: UTC+01:00 (CET)
  - Summer (DST): UTC+02:00 (CEST)
- INSEE/Postal code: 76013 /76540
- ^{1} French Land Register data, which excludes lakes, ponds, glaciers > 1 km^{2} (0.386 sq mi or 247 acres) and river estuaries.

Angerville-la-Martel (French pronunciation: [ɑ̃ʒɛʁvil la maʁtɛl]) is a commune in the Seine-Maritime department in the Normandy region in northern France.

== Geography ==
A farming village situated in the Pays de Caux, some 22 miles (35 km) northeast of Le Havre, at the junction of the D33 and the D925.

== Population ==
Historical population
Year	Pop.	±% p.a.
1968	594	—
1975	538	−1.40%
1982	589	+1.30%
1990	659	+1.41%
1999	672	+0.22%
2007	850	+2.98%
2012	926	+1.73%
2017	1,060	+2.74%
2023	1,079	+0.30%
Source: INSEE

== Places of interest ==
- The church of St.Martin, dating from the sixteenth century.
- A sixteenth century presbytery.

== See also ==
- Communes of the Seine-Maritime department
