= Sorquainville =

- Commune
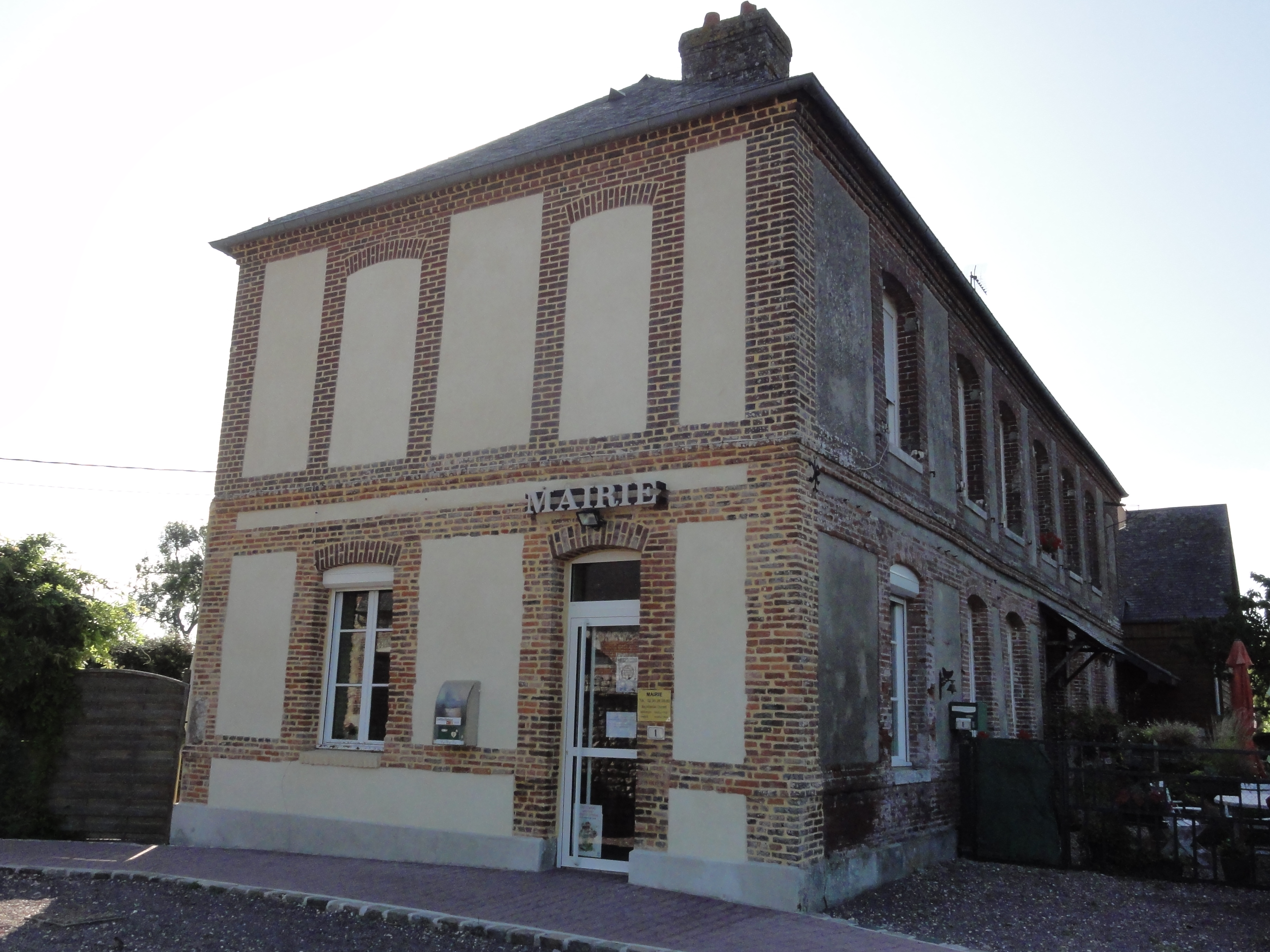
- Town hall

- Coat of arms
- Location of Sorquainville
- Location within France Location within Normandy
- Coordinates: 49°42′22″N 0°33′06″E
- Country: France
- Region: Normandy
- Department: Seine-Maritime
- Arrondissement: Le Havre
- Canton: Fécamp
- Intercommunality: CA Fécamp Caux Littoral

Government
  - Mayor (2020–2026): Annie Lavenu
- Area^{1}: 4.47 km^{2} (1.73 sq mi)
- Elevation: 115 m (377 ft)
- Highest elevation: 131 m (430 ft)
- Lowest elevation: 77 m (253 ft)
- Population (2023): 168
  - Density: 37.6/km^{2} (97.3/sq mi)
- Time zone: UTC+01:00 (CET)
  - Summer (DST): UTC+02:00 (CEST)
- INSEE/Postal code: 76680 /76540
- ^{1} French Land Register data, which excludes lakes, ponds, glaciers > 1 km^{2} (0.386 sq mi or 247 acres) and river estuaries.

Sorquainville is a commune in the Seine-Maritime department in the Normandy region in northern France.

== Geography ==
A small farming village, in the Valmont valley of the Pays de Caux, situated some 32 miles (51 km) northeast of Le Havre, at the junction of the D75 and D33 roads.

== Population ==
Historical population
Year	Pop.	±% p.a.
1968	231	—
1975	210	−1.35%
1982	174	−2.65%
1990	210	+2.38%
1999	162	−2.84%
2007	162	+0.00%
2012	181	+2.24%
2017	185	+0.44%
2023	168	−1.59%
Source: INSEE

== Places of interest ==
- The church of St. Martin, dating from the eleventh century.
- A chateau.

== See also ==
- Communes of the Seine-Maritime department
