= Ancretteville-sur-Mer =

- Commune
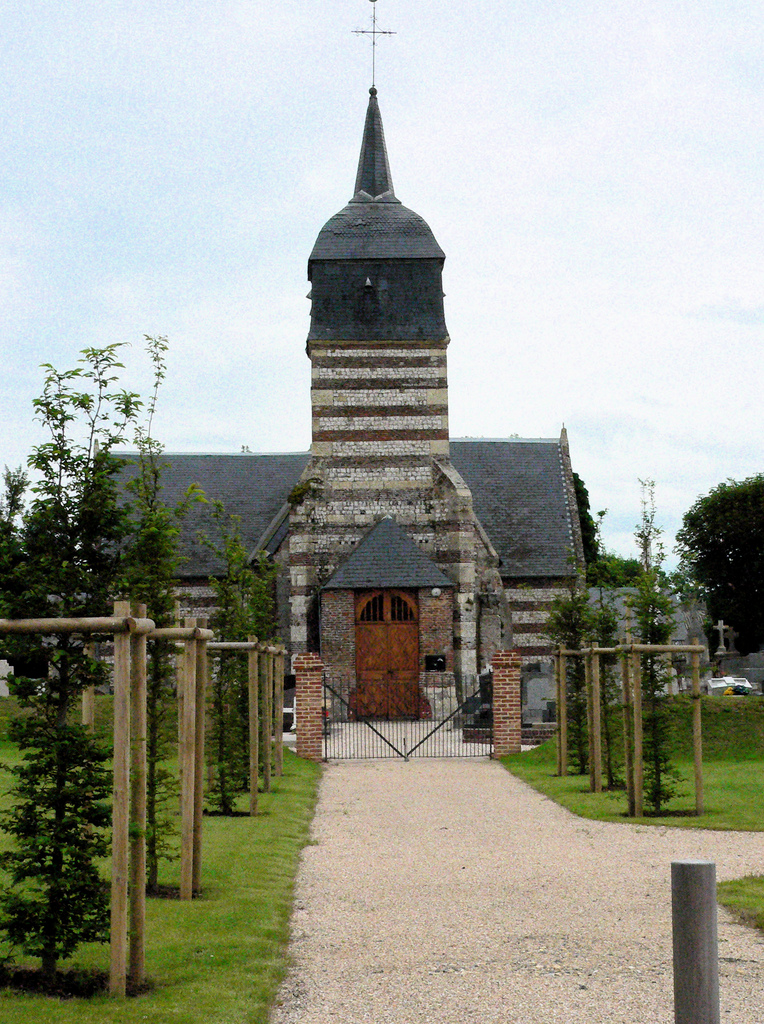
- The church in Ancretteville-sur-Mer
- Location of Ancretteville-sur-Mer
- Location within France Location within Normandy
- Coordinates: 49°47′21″N 0°30′44″E
- Country: France
- Region: Normandy
- Department: Seine-Maritime
- Arrondissement: Le Havre
- Canton: Fécamp
- Intercommunality: Fécamp Caux Littoral

Government
  - Mayor (2026–32): Jean-Louis Panel
- Area^{1}: 3.15 km^{2} (1.22 sq mi)
- Elevation: 98 m (322 ft)
- Highest elevation: 108 m (354 ft)
- Lowest elevation: 49 m (161 ft)
- Population (2023): 143
  - Density: 45.4/km^{2} (118/sq mi)
- Time zone: UTC+01:00 (CET)
  - Summer (DST): UTC+02:00 (CEST)
- INSEE/Postal code: 76011 /76540
- ^{1} French Land Register data, which excludes lakes, ponds, glaciers > 1 km^{2} (0.386 sq mi or 247 acres) and river estuaries.

Ancretteville-sur-Mer (French pronunciation: [ɑ̃kʁɛtvil syʁ mɛʁ], literally Ancretteville on Sea) is a commune in the Seine-Maritime department in the Normandy region in northern France.

== Geography ==
A small farming village situated some 32 miles (51 km) northeast of Le Havre, at the junction of the D33 and the D68.

== Population ==
Historical population
Year	Pop.	±% p.a.
1968	209	—
1975	162	−3.57%
1982	178	+1.35%
1990	183	+0.35%
1999	178	−0.31%
2007	177	−0.07%
2012	193	+1.75%
2017	170	−2.51%
2023	143	−2.84%
Source: INSEE

== Places of interest ==
- The church of Saint-Amand, dating from the twelfth century
- The eighteenth century Château d'Angerval.

== See also ==
- Communes of the Seine-Maritime department
