= Sainte-Hélène-Bondeville =

- Commune
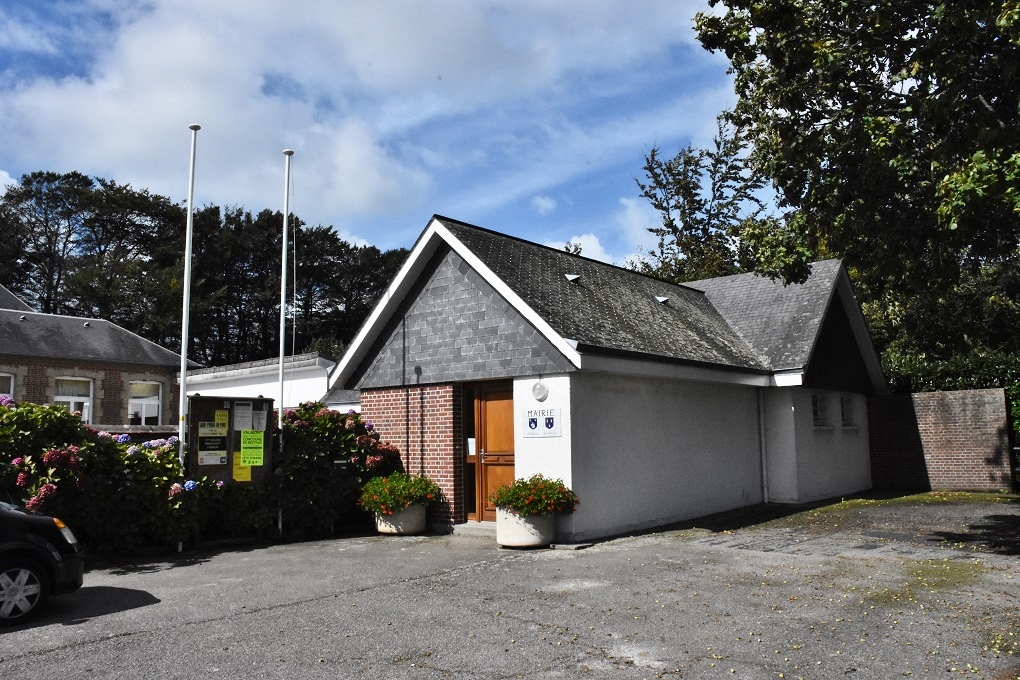
- The town hall in Sainte-Hélène-Bondeville

- Coat of arms
- Location of Sainte-Hélène-Bondeville
- Location within France Location within Normandy
- Coordinates: 49°46′31″N 0°27′36″E
- Country: France
- Region: Normandy
- Department: Seine-Maritime
- Arrondissement: Le Havre
- Canton: Fécamp
- Intercommunality: CA Fécamp Caux Littoral

Government
  - Mayor (2020–2026): Éric Rousselet
- Area^{1}: 6.82 km^{2} (2.63 sq mi)
- Elevation: 114 m (374 ft)
- Highest elevation: 125 m (410 ft)
- Lowest elevation: 55 m (180 ft)
- Population (2023): 681
  - Density: 99.9/km^{2} (259/sq mi)
- Time zone: UTC+01:00 (CET)
  - Summer (DST): UTC+02:00 (CEST)
- INSEE/Postal code: 76587 /76400
- ^{1} French Land Register data, which excludes lakes, ponds, glaciers > 1 km^{2} (0.386 sq mi or 247 acres) and river estuaries.

Sainte-Hélène-Bondeville (French pronunciation: [sɛ̃t elɛn bɔ̃dvil]) is a commune in the Seine-Maritime department in the Normandy region in northern France.

== Geography ==
A farming village, in the Pays de Caux, situated some 25 miles (40 km) northeast of Le Havre, at the junction of the D78 and D925 roads.

== Population ==
Historical population
Year	Pop.	±% p.a.
1968	422	—
1975	390	−1.12%
1982	542	+4.81%
1990	680	+2.88%
1999	680	+0.00%
2007	735	+0.98%
2012	701	−0.94%
2017	709	+0.23%
2023	681	−0.67%
Source: INSEE

== Places of interest ==
- A priory from the sixteenth century at Alventot.
- Two old sandstone crosses.
- The church of St. Heléne, dating from the sixteenth century.
- The ruins of the church of St. Clair.

== See also ==
- Communes of the Seine-Maritime department
