= Bénouville =

Bénouville may refer to several communes in France:

- Bénouville, Calvados, in the Calvados département
- Bénouville, Seine-Maritime, in the Seine-Maritime département
