= Bénouville, Seine-Maritime =

Bénouville
- Commune
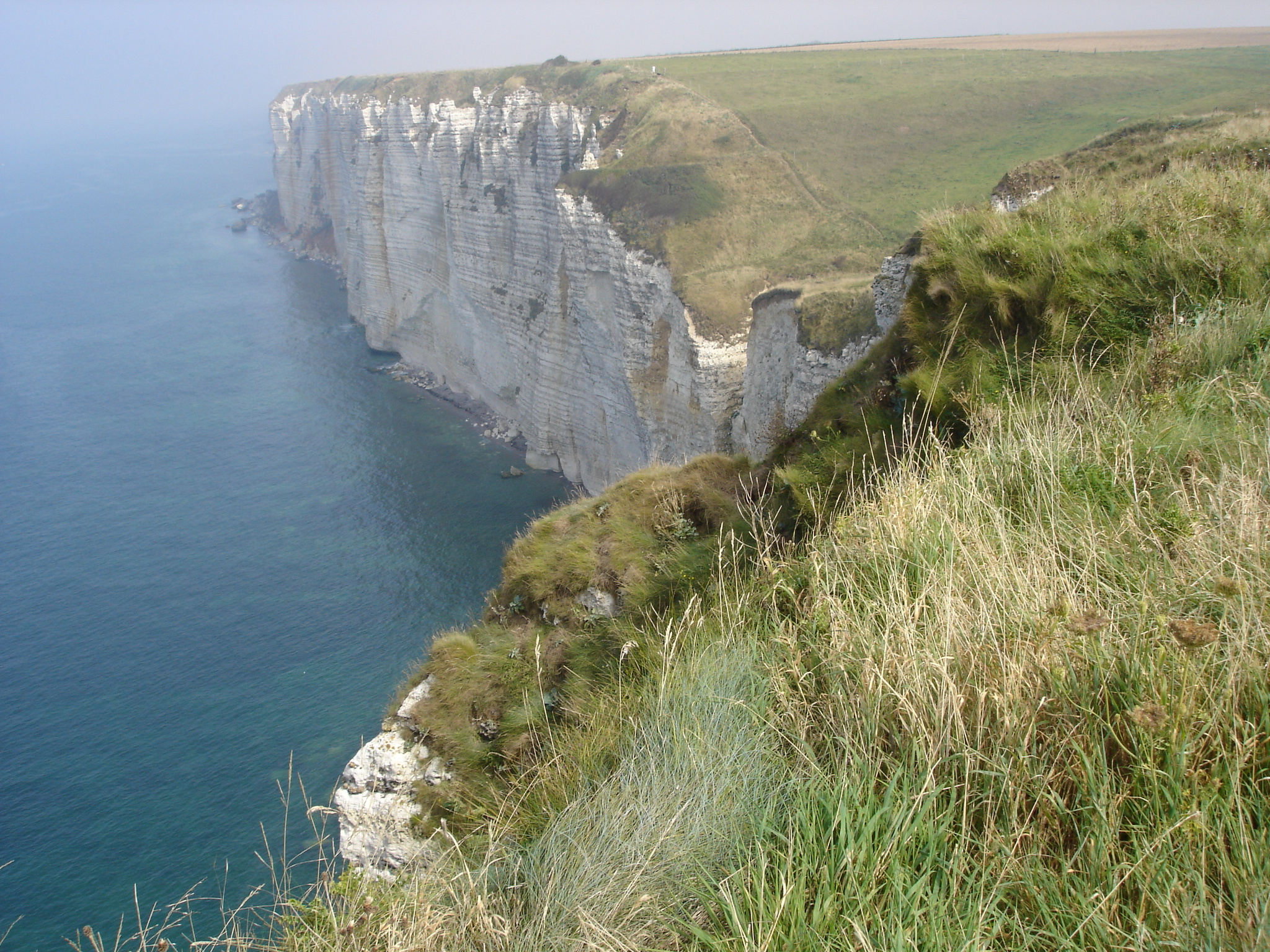
- Cliffs at Bénouville
- Location of Bénouville
- Location within France Location within Normandy
- Coordinates: 49°43′05″N 0°15′02″E
- Country: France
- Region: Normandy
- Department: Seine-Maritime
- Arrondissement: Le Havre
- Canton: Octeville-sur-Mer
- Intercommunality: Le Havre Seine Métropole

Government
  - Mayor (2020–2026): Jean-Pierre Leduc
- Area^{1}: 2.86 km^{2} (1.10 sq mi)
- Elevation: 80 m (260 ft)
- Highest elevation: 99 m (325 ft)
- Lowest elevation: 0 m (0 ft)
- Population (2023): 168
  - Density: 58.7/km^{2} (152/sq mi)
- Time zone: UTC+01:00 (CET)
  - Summer (DST): UTC+02:00 (CEST)
- INSEE/Postal code: 76079 /76790
- ^{1} French Land Register data, which excludes lakes, ponds, glaciers > 1 km^{2} (0.386 sq mi or 247 acres) and river estuaries.

Bénouville (French pronunciation: [benuvil]) is a commune in the Seine-Maritime department in the Normandy region in northern France.

== Geography ==
A small farming village situated in the Pays de Caux, some 20 miles (32 km) northeast of Le Havre, at the junction of the D11 and D72 roads and on the coast of the English Channel.

== Population ==
Historical population
Year	Pop.	±% p.a.
1968	139	—
1975	128	−1.17%
1982	145	+1.80%
1990	146	+0.09%
1999	128	−1.45%
2007	119	−0.91%
2012	171	+7.52%
2017	179	+0.92%
2023	168	−1.05%
Source: INSEE

== Places of interest ==
- The seventeenth century chateau.
- The church of St.Riquier, dating from the eleventh century.

== See also ==
- Communes of the Seine-Maritime department
