= Canton of Forges-les-Eaux =

Coordinates: 49°37′16″N 1°34′25″E

Forges-les-Eaux
- Former canton
- Interactive map of Forges-les-Eaux
- Country: France
- Region: Normandy
- Department: Seine-Maritime
- No. of communes: {{{nbcomm}}}
- Disbanded: 2015
- Area: 230.63 km^{2} (89.05 sq mi)
- Population (2012): 10,991
  - Density: 47.656/km^{2} (123.43/sq mi)

The Canton of Forges-les-Eaux is a former canton situated in Seine-Maritime, a département in the Haute-Normandie region of northern France. It was disbanded following the French canton reorganisation which came into effect in March 2015. It consisted of 21 communes, which joined the canton of Gournay-en-Bray in 2015. It had a total of 10,991 inhabitants (2012).

== Geography ==
It was in the arrondissement of Dieppe, centred on the town of Forges-les-Eaux. The altitude varies from 101m (Mesnil-Mauger) to 246m (Gaillefontaine) for an average altitude of 170m.

The canton comprised 21 communes:

- Beaubec-la-Rosière
- Beaussault
- La Bellière
- Compainville
- La Ferté-Saint-Samson
- Forges-les-Eaux
- Le Fossé
- Gaillefontaine
- Grumesnil
- Haucourt
- Haussez
- Longmesnil
- Mauquenchy
- Mesnil-Mauger
- Pommereux
- Roncherolles-en-Bray
- Rouvray-Catillon
- Saint-Michel-d'Halescourt
- Saumont-la-Poterie
- Serqueux
- Le Thil-Riberpré

== Population ==
Historical population Canton of Forges-les-Eaux
| Year | 1962 | 1968 | 1975 | 1982 | 1990 | 1999 | 2006 | 2007 | 2008 |
| Pop. | 9,873 | 10,697 | 10,077 | 9,921 | 9,914 | 10,340 | 10,856 | 10,906 | 10,988 |
| ±% | — | +8.3% | −5.8% | −1.5% | −0.1% | +4.3% | +5.0% | +0.5% | +0.8% |
From the year 1962 on: No double counting – residents of multiple communes (e.g. students and military personnel) are counted only once. Source: INSEE

== See also ==
- Arrondissements of the Seine-Maritime department
- Cantons of the Seine-Maritime department
- Communes of the Seine-Maritime department
