= Communauté de communes du Canton de Forges-les-Eaux =

Coordinates: 49.6132°N 1.5461°E

Canton de Forges-les-Eaux
- Former communauté de communes
- Interactive map of Canton de Forges-les-Eaux
- Country: France
- Region: Normandy
- Department: Seine-Maritime
- No. of communes: {{{nbcomm}}}
- Established: 2001
- Disbanded: 2017
- Area: 230.63 km^{2} (89.05 sq mi)
- Population (1999): 10,340
  - Density: 44.83/km^{2} (116.1/sq mi)

The Communauté de communes du Canton de Forges-les-Eaux was located in the Seine-Maritime département of the Normandy region of northern France. It was created in December 2001. It was merged into the new Communauté de communes des 4 rivières in January 2017.

== Participants ==
The Communauté de communes comprised the following communes:

- Beaubec-la-Rosière
- Beaussault
- La Bellière
- Compainville
- La Ferté-Saint-Samson
- Forges-les-Eaux
- Gaillefontaine
- Grumesnil
- Haucourt
- Haussez
- Longmesnil
- Mauquenchy
- Mesnil-Mauger
- Pommereux
- Roncherolles-en-Bray
- Rouvray-Catillon
- Saint-Michel-d'Halescourt
- Saumont-la-Poterie
- Serqueux
- Le Thil-Riberpré

== See also ==
Communes of the Seine-Maritime department
