= Communauté de communes du Bray-Normand =

Coordinates: 49.4805°N 1.7224°E

Bray-Normand
- Former communauté de communes
- Interactive map of Bray-Normand
- Country: France
- Region: Normandy
- Department: Eure, Seine-Maritime
- No. of communes: {{{nbcomm}}}
- Established: 31 December 2001
- Disbanded: 2017
- Area: 189.82 km^{2} (73.29 sq mi)
- Population (1999): 12,124
  - Density: 63.871/km^{2} (165.43/sq mi)

The Communauté de communes du Bray-Normand (before 2015: Communauté de communes du Canton de Gournay-en-Bray) was located in the Seine-Maritime and Eure département of the Normandy region of northern France. It was created on 31 December 2001. It was merged into the new Communauté de communes des 4 rivières in January 2017.

== Participants ==
The Communauté de communes comprised the following 18 communes:

- Avesnes-en-Bray
- Bézancourt
- Bosc-Hyons
- Bouchevilliers
- Brémontier-Merval
- Cuy-Saint-Fiacre
- Dampierre-en-Bray
- Doudeauville
- Elbeuf-en-Bray
- Ernemont-la-Villette
- Ferrières-en-Bray
- Gancourt-Saint-Étienne
- Gournay-en-Bray
- Martagny
- Ménerval
- Molagnies
- Montroty
- Neuf-Marché

== See also ==
- Communes of the Seine-Maritime department
