= Canton of Argueil =

Coordinates: 49°30′36″N 1°29′36″E

Argueil
- Former canton
- Interactive map of Argueil
- Country: France
- Region: Normandy
- Department: Seine-Maritime
- No. of communes: {{{nbcomm}}}
- Disbanded: 2015
- Area: 180.50 km^{2} (69.69 sq mi)
- Population (2012): 5,568
  - Density: 30.85/km^{2} (79.90/sq mi)

The Canton of Argueil is a former canton situated in the Seine-Maritime département and in the Haute-Normandie region of northern France. It was disbanded following the French canton reorganisation which came into effect in March 2015. It consisted of 14 communes, which joined the canton of Gournay-en-Bray in 2015. It had a total of 5,568 inhabitants (2012).

== Geography ==
An area of farming and forestry in the arrondissement of Dieppe, centred on the town of Argueil. The altitude varies from 53m (Croisy-sur-Andelle) to 231m (Beauvoir-en-Lyons) with an average altitude of 160m.

The canton comprised 14 communes:

- Argueil
- Beauvoir-en-Lyons
- La Chapelle-Saint-Ouen
- Croisy-sur-Andelle
- La Feuillie
- Fry
- La Hallotière
- La Haye
- Hodeng-Hodenger
- Mésangueville
- Le Mesnil-Lieubray
- Morville-sur-Andelle
- Nolléval
- Sigy-en-Bray

== Population ==
Historical population Canton of Argueil
Year	1962	1968	1975	1982	1990	1999
Pop.	4,255	4,643	4,390	4,342	4,355	4,574
±%	—	+9.1%	−5.4%	−1.1%	+0.3%	+5.0%
From the year 1962 on: No double counting – residents of multiple communes (e.g. students and military personnel) are counted only once. Source: INSEE

== See also ==
- Arrondissements of the Seine-Maritime department
- Cantons of the Seine-Maritime department
- Communes of the Seine-Maritime department
