= Communauté de communes des Monts et de l'Andelle =

Coordinates: 49°32′30″N 1°30′57″E

les Monts et l'Andelle
- Former communauté de communes
- Country: France
- Region: Normandy
- Department: Seine-Maritime
- No. of communes: {{{nbcomm}}}
- Established: 1 January 2003
- Disbanded: 2017
- Area: 191.22 km^{2} (73.83 sq mi)
- Population (1999): 4,805
  - Density: 25.13/km^{2} (65.08/sq mi)

The Communauté de communes des Monts et de l'Andelle was located in the Seine-Maritime département of the Normandy région of north-western France. It was created in January 2003. It was merged into the new Communauté de communes des 4 rivières in January 2017.

== Participants ==
The Communauté de communes comprised the following 15 communes:

- Argueil
- Beauvoir-en-Lyons
- La Chapelle-Saint-Ouen
- Croisy-sur-Andelle
- La Feuillie
- Fry
- La Hallotière
- La Haye
- Le Héron
- Hodeng-Hodenger
- Mésangueville
- Le Mesnil-Lieubray
- Morville-sur-Andelle
- Nolléval
- Sigy-en-Bray

== See also ==
- Communes of the Seine-Maritime department
