= Molagnies =

- Commune
- Location of Molagnies
- Location within France Location within Normandy
- Coordinates: 49°31′16″N 1°43′24″E
- Country: France
- Region: Normandy
- Department: Seine-Maritime
- Arrondissement: Dieppe
- Canton: Gournay-en-Bray
- Intercommunality: CC 4 rivières

Government
  - Mayor (2026–32): Christian Ducrocq
- Area^{1}: 4.65 km^{2} (1.80 sq mi)
- Elevation: 101 m (331 ft)
- Highest elevation: 183 m (600 ft)
- Lowest elevation: 97 m (318 ft)
- Population (2023): 209
  - Density: 44.9/km^{2} (116/sq mi)
- Time zone: UTC+01:00 (CET)
  - Summer (DST): UTC+02:00 (CEST)
- INSEE/Postal code: 76440 /76220
- ^{1} French Land Register data, which excludes lakes, ponds, glaciers > 1 km^{2} (0.386 sq mi or 247 acres) and river estuaries.

Molagnies (French pronunciation: [mɔlaɲi]) is a commune in the Seine-Maritime department in the Normandy region in northern France.

== Geography ==
A small farming village situated by the banks of the Epte river in the Pays de Bray, some 31 miles (50 km) east of Rouen on the D57 road and at the border with the department of Oise.

== Population ==
Historical population
Year	Pop.	±% p.a.
1968	84	—
1975	75	−1.61%
1982	83	+1.46%
1990	119	+4.61%
1999	149	+2.53%
2007	152	+0.25%
2012	179	+3.32%
2017	167	−1.38%
2023	209	+3.81%
Source: INSEE

== Places of interest ==
- The church of St. Manvieu, dating from the thirteenth century.
- A fifteenth century manorhouse.

== See also ==
- Communes of the Seine-Maritime department
