= Doudeauville, Seine-Maritime =

Doudeauville
- Commune
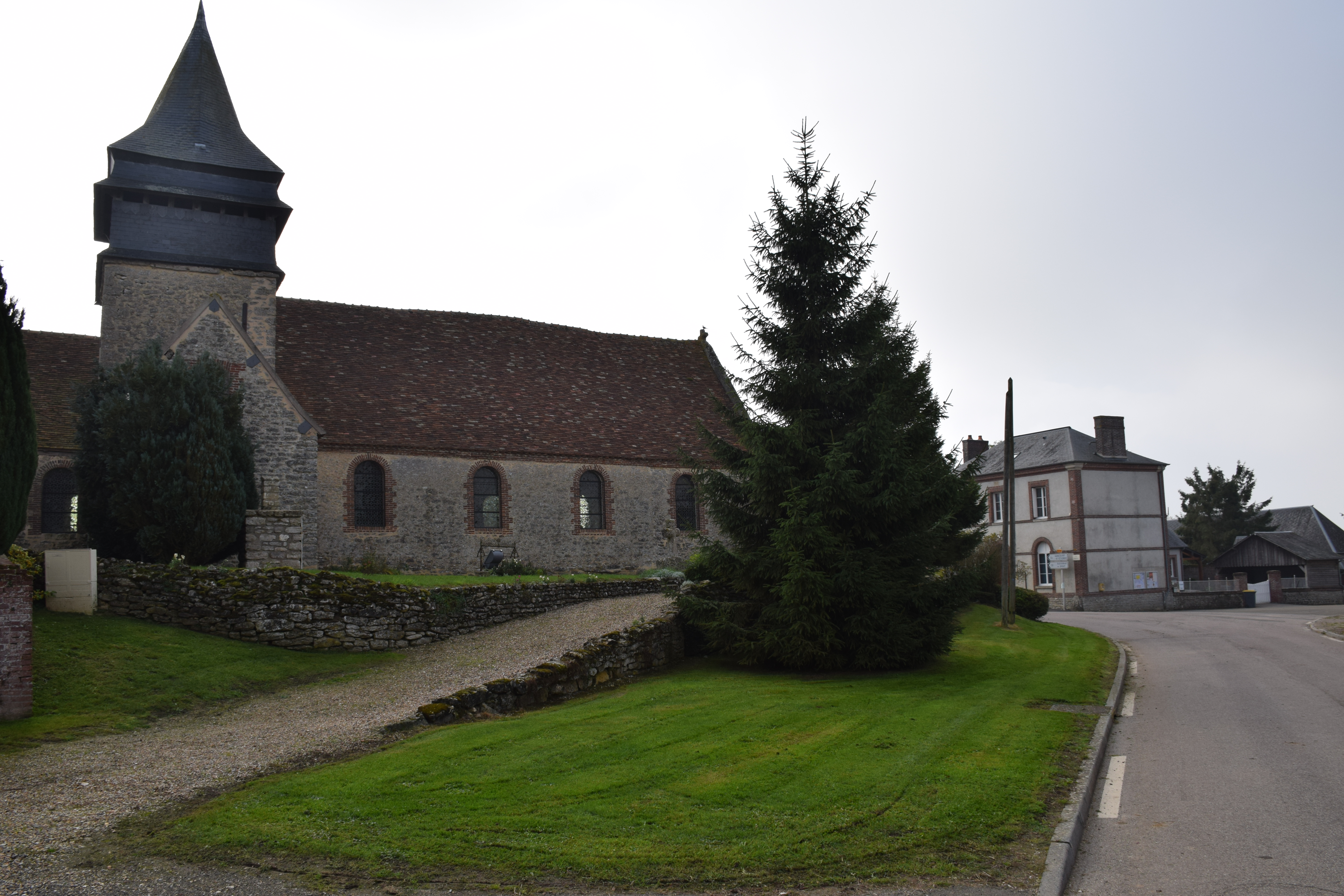
- The church and town hall in Doudeauville
- Location of Doudeauville
- Location within France Location within Normandy
- Coordinates: 49°34′23″N 1°42′20″E
- Country: France
- Region: Normandy
- Department: Seine-Maritime
- Arrondissement: Dieppe
- Canton: Gournay-en-Bray
- Intercommunality: CC 4 rivières

Government
  - Mayor (2026–32): Michaël Beuvin
- Area^{1}: 3.94 km^{2} (1.52 sq mi)
- Elevation: 185 m (607 ft)
- Highest elevation: 206 m (676 ft)
- Lowest elevation: 108 m (354 ft)
- Population (2023): 115
  - Density: 29.2/km^{2} (75.6/sq mi)
- Time zone: UTC+01:00 (CET)
  - Summer (DST): UTC+02:00 (CEST)
- INSEE/Postal code: 76218 /76220
- ^{1} French Land Register data, which excludes lakes, ponds, glaciers > 1 km^{2} (0.386 sq mi or 247 acres) and river estuaries.

Doudeauville (French pronunciation: [dudovil]) is a commune in the Seine-Maritime department in the Normandy region in northern France.

== Geography ==
A very small farming village situated in the Pays de Caux, some 40 miles (64 km) southeast of Dieppe, on the D8 road and in the Epte river valley.

== Population ==
Historical population
Year	Pop.	±% p.a.
1968	108	—
1975	102	−0.81%
1982	72	−4.85%
1990	68	−0.71%
1999	81	+1.96%
2007	96	+2.15%
2012	90	−1.28%
2017	87	−0.68%
2023	115	+4.76%
Source: INSEE

== Places of interest ==
- The church of St. Aubin, dating from the sixteenth century.
- The chapel of St.Clothilde, dating from the nineteenth century.

== See also ==
- Communes of the Seine-Maritime department
