= Ernemont-la-Villette =

- Commune
- Location of Ernemont-la-Villette
- Location within France Location within Normandy
- Coordinates: 49°27′42″N 1°41′52″E
- Country: France
- Region: Normandy
- Department: Seine-Maritime
- Arrondissement: Dieppe
- Canton: Gournay-en-Bray
- Intercommunality: CC 4 rivières

Government
  - Mayor (2026–32): Robert Letondeur
- Area^{1}: 7.46 km^{2} (2.88 sq mi)
- Elevation: 150 m (490 ft)
- Highest elevation: 217 m (712 ft)
- Lowest elevation: 83 m (272 ft)
- Population (2023): 218
  - Density: 29.2/km^{2} (75.7/sq mi)
- Time zone: UTC+01:00 (CET)
  - Summer (DST): UTC+02:00 (CEST)
- INSEE/Postal code: 76242 /76220
- ^{1} French Land Register data, which excludes lakes, ponds, glaciers > 1 km^{2} (0.386 sq mi or 247 acres) and river estuaries.

Ernemont-la-Villette (French pronunciation: [ɛʁnəmɔ̃ la vilɛt]) is a commune in the Seine-Maritime department in the Normandy region in northern France.

== Geography ==
A small farming village situated by the banks of the Epte river, in the Pays de Bray, some 28 miles (45 km) east of Rouen, at the junction of the D221 with the D915 and D916 roads.

== Population ==
Historical population
| Year | Pop. | ±% p.a. |
|---|---|---|
| 1968 | 174 | — |
| 1975 | 131 | −3.97% |
| 1982 | 146 | +1.56% |
| 1990 | 180 | +2.65% |
| 1999 | 176 | −0.25% |
| 2007 | 194 | +1.22% |
| 2012 | 193 | −0.10% |
| 2017 | 180 | −1.38% |
| 2023 | 218 | +3.24% |
Source: INSEE

== Places of interest ==
- A seventeenth-century stone cross.
- The Château d’Ernemont
- The eighteenth-century Château de Launay.
- The chapel at Launay, dating from the eighteenth century.
- The church of St.Martin, dating from the seventeenth century.

== See also ==
- Communes of the Seine-Maritime department
