= Ménerval =

- Commune
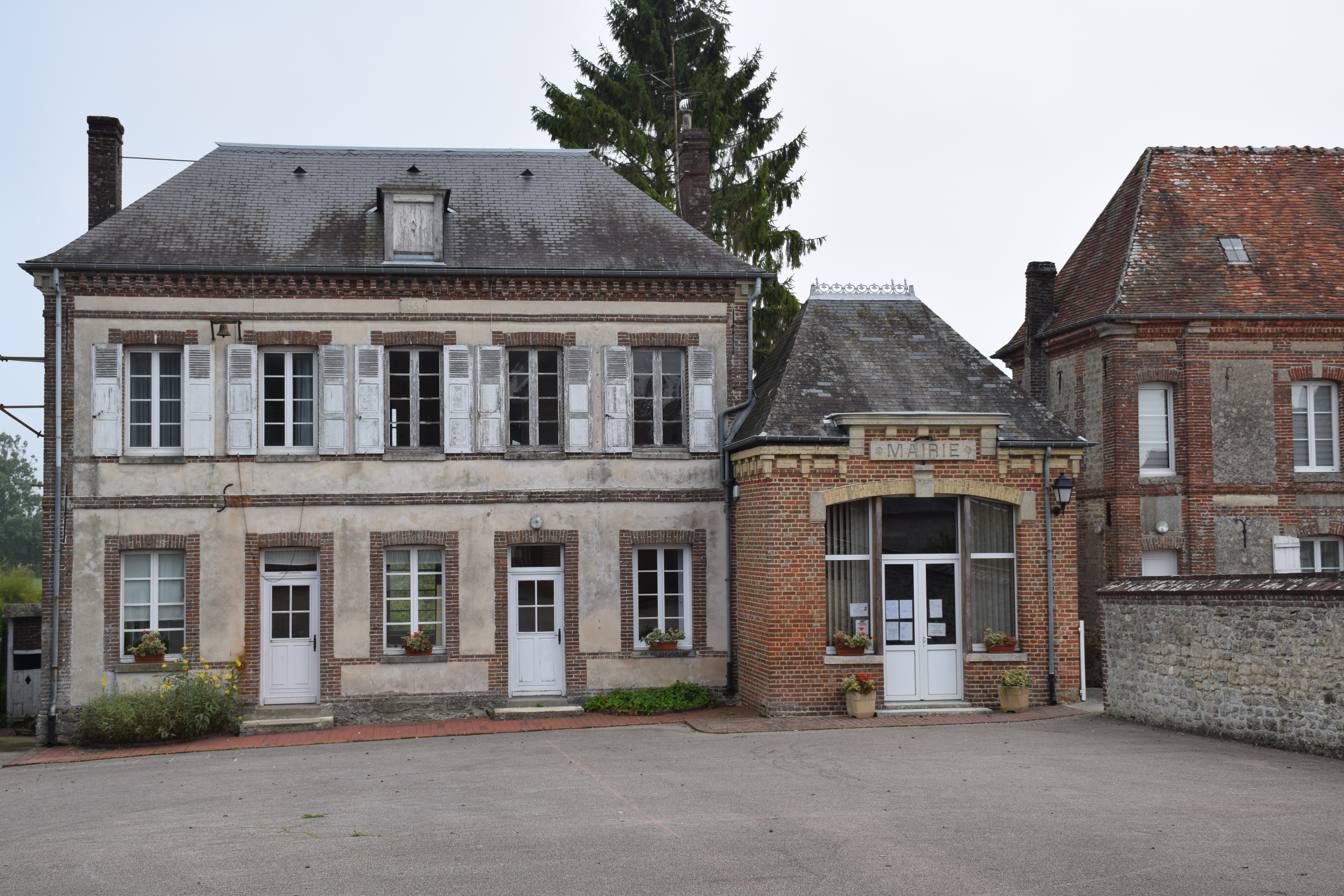
- The town hall in Ménerval
- Location of Ménerval
- Location within France Location within Normandy
- Coordinates: 49°33′56″N 1°39′31″E
- Country: France
- Region: Normandy
- Department: Seine-Maritime
- Arrondissement: Dieppe
- Canton: Gournay-en-Bray
- Intercommunality: CC 4 rivières

Government
  - Mayor (2026–32): Alain Beaufils
- Area^{1}: 12.43 km^{2} (4.80 sq mi)
- Elevation: 145 m (476 ft)
- Highest elevation: 191 m (627 ft)
- Lowest elevation: 107 m (351 ft)
- Population (2023): 178
  - Density: 14.3/km^{2} (37.1/sq mi)
- Time zone: UTC+01:00 (CET)
  - Summer (DST): UTC+02:00 (CEST)
- INSEE/Postal code: 76423 /76220
- ^{1} French Land Register data, which excludes lakes, ponds, glaciers > 1 km^{2} (0.386 sq mi or 247 acres) and river estuaries.

Ménerval (French pronunciation: [menɛʁval]) is a commune in the Seine-Maritime department in the Normandy region in northern France.

== Geography ==
A small farming village situated by the banks of the river Epte in the Pays de Bray, some 21 miles (34 km) northeast of Rouen at the junction of the D130 and the D76 roads.

== Population ==
Historical population
Year	Pop.	±% p.a.
1968	261	—
1975	231	−1.73%
1982	173	−4.05%
1990	159	−1.05%
1999	177	+1.20%
2007	187	+0.69%
2012	189	+0.21%
2017	173	−1.75%
2023	178	+0.48%
Source: INSEE

== Places of interest ==
- The church of Notre-Dame, dating from the eleventh century.
- An old stone bridge spanning the river.

== See also ==
- Communes of the Seine-Maritime department
