= Communauté de communes des 4 rivières =

Federation of municipalities in France

4 rivières
- Communauté de communes
- Interactive map of 4 rivières
- Coordinates: 49°29′N 01°43′E
- Country: France
- Region: Normandy
- Department: Eure, Seine-Maritime
- No. of communes: {{{nbcomm}}}
- Established: 2017
- Area: 607.3 km^{2} (234.5 sq mi)
- Population (2019): 29,270
  - Density: 48.20/km^{2} (124.8/sq mi)

The Communauté de communes des 4 rivières (also: Communauté de communes des Quatre Rivières en Bray) is a communauté de communes in the Seine-Maritime and Eure départements and in the Normandy région of France. It was formed on 1 January 2017 by the merger of the former Communauté de communes du Bray-Normand, Communauté de communes du Canton de Forges-les-Eaux and Communauté de communes des Monts et de l'Andelle on 1 January 2017. It consists of 52 communes (of which 1 in Eure), and its seat is in Gournay-en-Bray. Its area is 607.3 km^{2}, and its population was 29,270 in 2019.

== Composition ==
The communauté de communes consists of the following 53 communes, of which 52 in the Seine-Maritime department and 1 (Bouchevilliers) in Eure:

1. Argueil
2. Avesnes-en-Bray
3. Beaubec-la-Rosière
4. Beaussault
5. Beauvoir-en-Lyons
6. La Bellière
7. Bézancourt
8. Bosc-Hyons
9. Bouchevilliers
10. Brémontier-Merval
11. La Chapelle-Saint-Ouen
12. Compainville
13. Croisy-sur-Andelle
14. Cuy-Saint-Fiacre
15. Dampierre-en-Bray
16. Doudeauville
17. Elbeuf-en-Bray
18. Ernemont-la-Villette
19. Ferrières-en-Bray
20. La Ferté-Saint-Samson
21. La Feuillie
22. Forges-les-Eaux
23. Fry
24. Gaillefontaine
25. Gancourt-Saint-Étienne
26. Gournay-en-Bray
27. Grumesnil
28. La Hallotière
29. Haucourt
30. Haussez
31. La Haye
32. Hodeng-Hodenger
33. Longmesnil
34. Mauquenchy
35. Ménerval
36. Mésangueville
37. Le Mesnil-Lieubray
38. Mesnil-Mauger
39. Molagnies
40. Montroty
41. Morville-le-Héron
42. Neuf-Marché
43. Nolléval
44. Pommereux
45. Roncherolles-en-Bray
46. Rouvray-Catillon
47. Saint-Lucien
48. Saint-Michel-d'Halescourt
49. Saumont-la-Poterie
50. Serqueux
51. Sigy-en-Bray
52. Le Thil-Riberpré
