= Dampierre-en-Bray =

- Commune
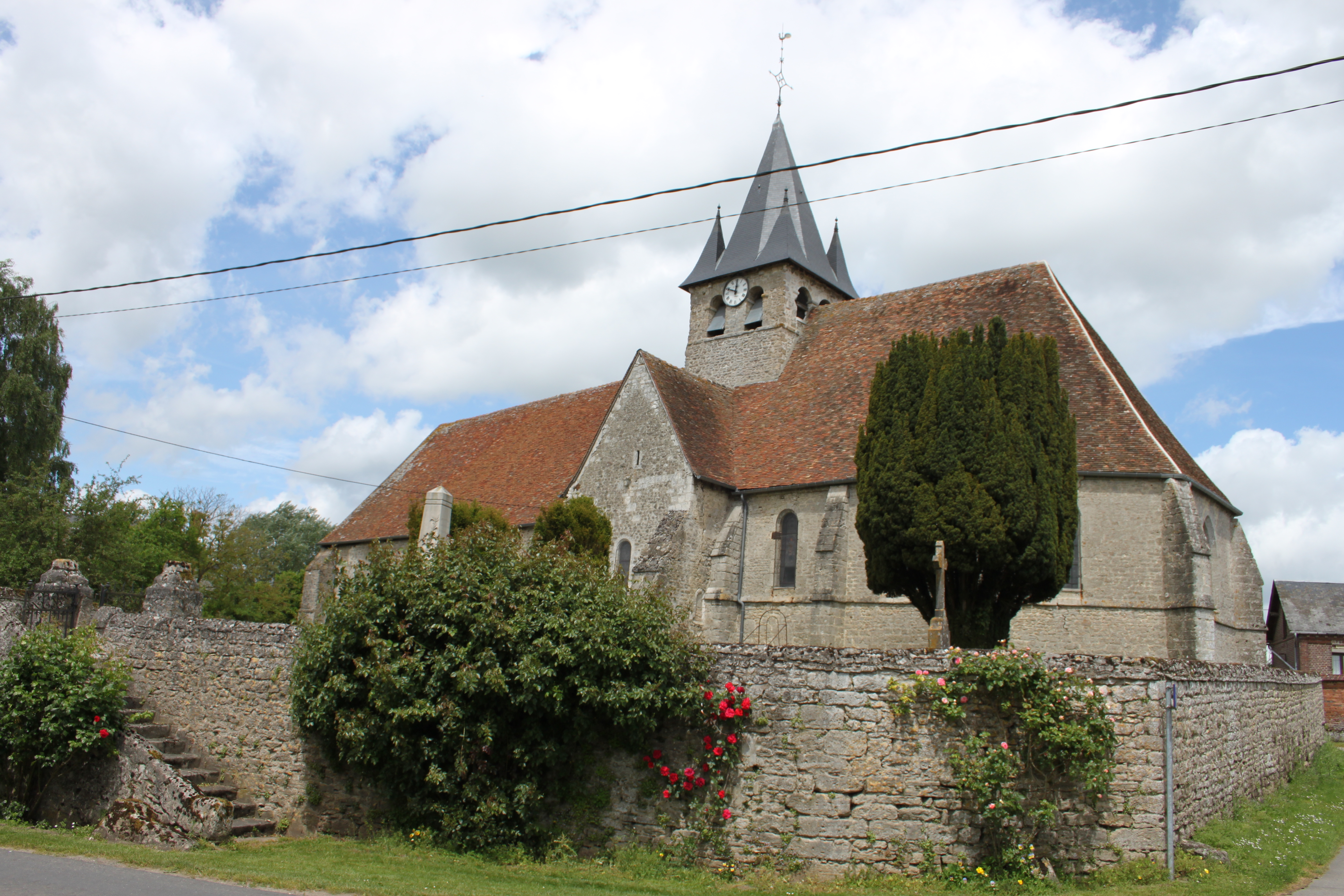
- The church in Dampierre-en-Bray
- Location of Dampierre-en-Bray
- Location within France Location within Normandy
- Coordinates: 49°31′57″N 1°39′36″E
- Country: France
- Region: Normandy
- Department: Seine-Maritime
- Arrondissement: Dieppe
- Canton: Gournay-en-Bray
- Intercommunality: CC 4 rivières

Government
  - Mayor (2026–32): Sophie Petit
- Area^{1}: 12.82 km^{2} (4.95 sq mi)
- Elevation: 124 m (407 ft)
- Highest elevation: 168 m (551 ft)
- Lowest elevation: 102 m (335 ft)
- Population (2023): 451
  - Density: 35.2/km^{2} (91.1/sq mi)
- Time zone: UTC+01:00 (CET)
  - Summer (DST): UTC+02:00 (CEST)
- INSEE/Postal code: 76209 /76220
- ^{1} French Land Register data, which excludes lakes, ponds, glaciers > 1 km^{2} (0.386 sq mi or 247 acres) and river estuaries.

Dampierre-en-Bray (French pronunciation: [dɑ̃pjɛʁ ɑ̃ bʁɛ], literally Dampierre in Bray) is a commune in the Seine-Maritime department in the Normandy region in northwestern France.

== Geography ==
A farming village situated by the banks of the river Epte in the Pays de Bray, some 40 miles (64 km) south of Dieppe, at the junction of the D16 and the D84 roads.

== Population ==
Historical population
Year	Pop.	±% p.a.
1968	340	—
1975	333	−0.30%
1982	321	−0.52%
1990	323	+0.08%
1999	367	+1.43%
2007	432	+2.06%
2012	459	+1.22%
2017	453	−0.26%
2023	451	−0.07%
Source: INSEE

== Places of interest ==
- The thirteenth-century chateau des Huguenots at Beuvreuil.
- A fifteenth-century fortified manorhouse at Ramburesl.
- The church of St.Pierre at Dampierre, dating from the sixteenth century.
- The church of St.Pierre at Beuvreuil, dating from the eleventh century.

== See also ==
- Communes of the Seine-Maritime department
