= La Bellière, Seine-Maritime =

La Bellière
- Commune
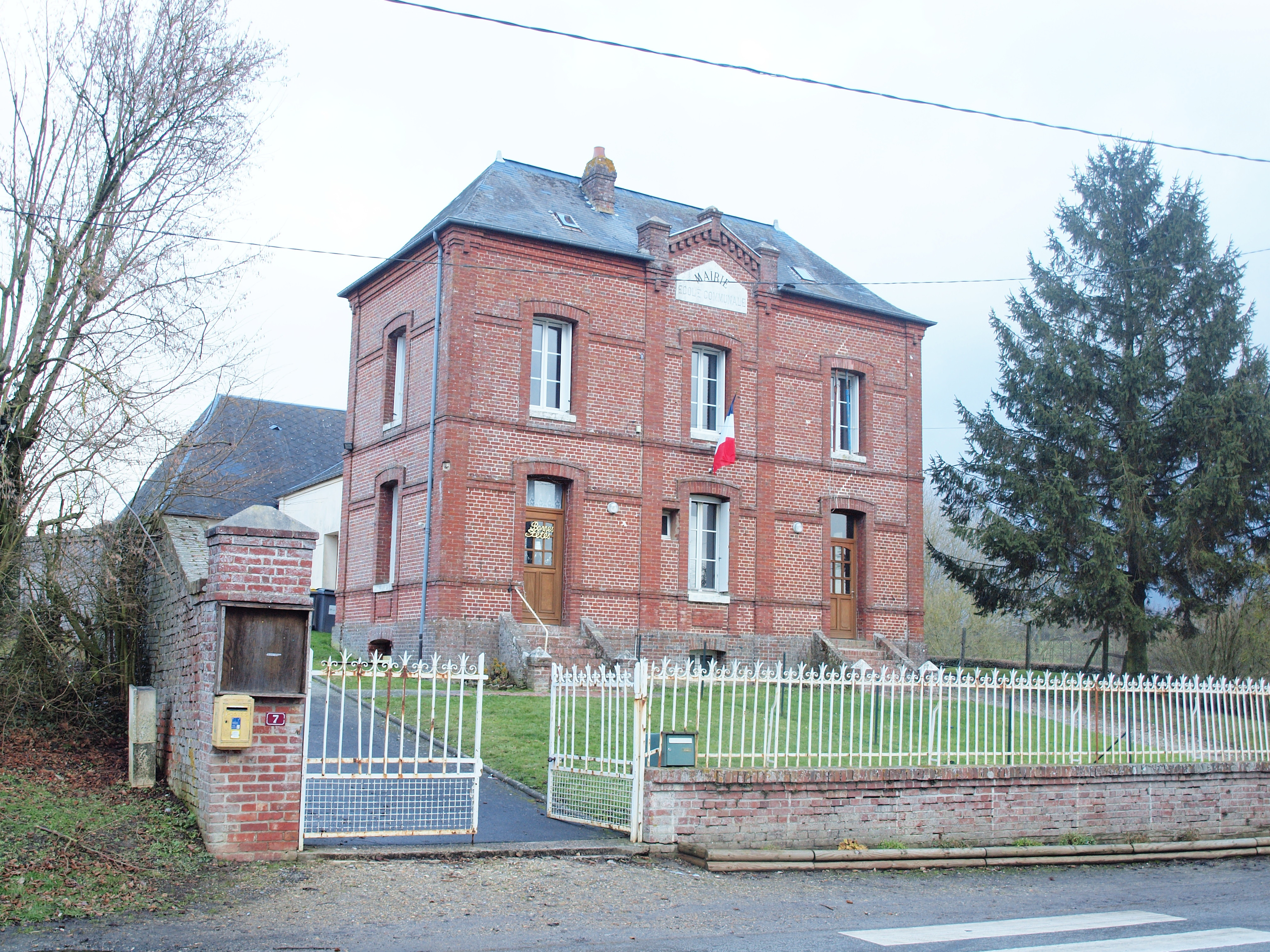
- The town hall in La Bellière
- Location of La Bellière
- Location within France Location within Normandy
- Coordinates: 49°36′12″N 1°35′48″E
- Country: France
- Region: Normandy
- Department: Seine-Maritime
- Arrondissement: Dieppe
- Canton: Gournay-en-Bray
- Intercommunality: CC 4 rivières

Government
  - Mayor (2020–2026): Odile Dion
- Area^{1}: 4.54 km^{2} (1.75 sq mi)
- Elevation: 142 m (466 ft)
- Highest elevation: 189 m (620 ft)
- Lowest elevation: 132 m (433 ft)
- Population (2023): 50
  - Density: 11/km^{2} (29/sq mi)
- Time zone: UTC+01:00 (CET)
  - Summer (DST): UTC+02:00 (CEST)
- INSEE/Postal code: 76074 /76440
- ^{1} French Land Register data, which excludes lakes, ponds, glaciers > 1 km^{2} (0.386 sq mi or 247 acres) and river estuaries.

La Bellière (French pronunciation: [la bɛljɛʁ]) is a commune in the Seine-Maritime department in the Normandy region in northern France.

== Geography ==
A very small farming village situated by the banks of the river Epte in the Pays de Bray, some 39 miles (63 km) southeast of Dieppe at the junction of the D61 and the D129 roads.

== Population ==
Historical population
Year	Pop.	±% p.a.
1968	90	—
1975	62	−5.18%
1982	75	+2.76%
1990	54	−4.02%
1999	71	+3.09%
2007	59	−2.29%
2012	52	−2.49%
2017	57	+1.85%
2023	50	−2.16%
Source: INSEE

== Places of interest ==
- The church of St.Laurent, dating from the twelfth century.

== See also ==
- Communes of the Seine-Maritime department
