= Longmesnil =

- Commune
- Location of Longmesnil
- Location within France Location within Normandy
- Coordinates: 49°36′52″N 1°36′42″E
- Country: France
- Region: Normandy
- Department: Seine-Maritime
- Arrondissement: Dieppe
- Canton: Gournay-en-Bray
- Intercommunality: CC 4 rivières

Government
  - Mayor (2026–32): Isabelle Duval
- Area^{1}: 3.86 km^{2} (1.49 sq mi)
- Elevation: 159 m (522 ft)
- Highest elevation: 229 m (751 ft)
- Lowest elevation: 146 m (479 ft)
- Population (2023): 45
  - Density: 12/km^{2} (30/sq mi)
- Time zone: UTC+01:00 (CET)
  - Summer (DST): UTC+02:00 (CEST)
- INSEE/Postal code: 76393 /76440
- ^{1} French Land Register data, which excludes lakes, ponds, glaciers > 1 km^{2} (0.386 sq mi or 247 acres) and river estuaries.

Longmesnil (French pronunciation: [lɔ̃menil]) is a commune in the Seine-Maritime department in the Normandy region in northern France.

== Geography ==
A tiny farming village situated in the valley of the river Epte in the Pays de Bray, some 38 miles (61 km) southeast of Dieppe on the D129 near its junction with the D156 road.

== Population ==
Historical population
Year	Pop.	±% p.a.
1968	83	—
1975	50	−6.98%
1982	50	+0.00%
1990	49	−0.25%
1999	38	−2.79%
2007	55	+4.73%
2012	56	+0.36%
2017	52	−1.47%
2023	45	−2.38%
Source: INSEE

== Places of interest ==
- The church of St.Martin, dating from the twelfth century.

== See also ==
- Communes of the Seine-Maritime department
