= Gancourt-Saint-Étienne =

- Commune
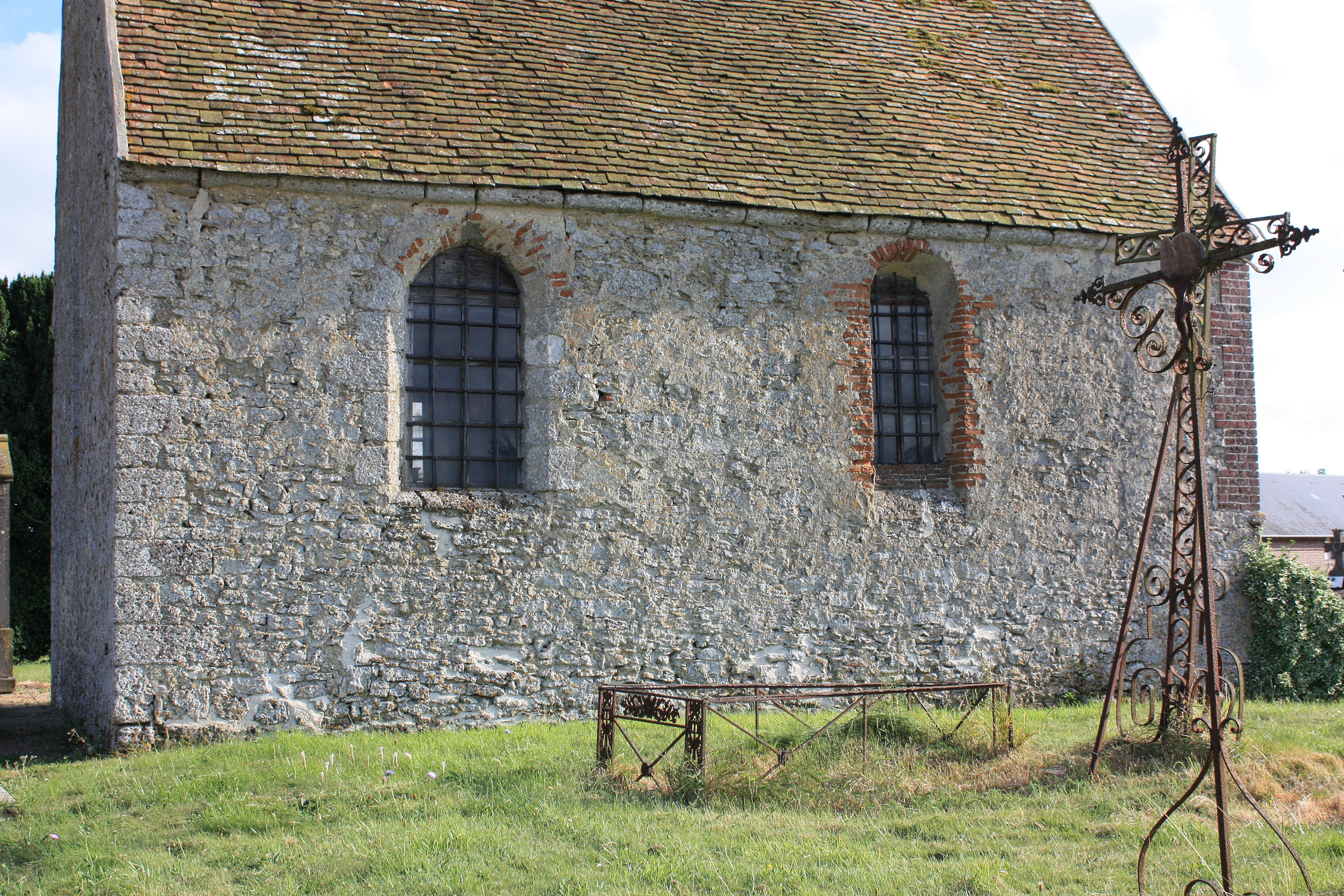
- The church in Saint-Étienne
- Location of Gancourt-Saint-Étienne
- Location within France Location within Normandy
- Coordinates: 49°32′56″N 1°42′34″E
- Country: France
- Region: Normandy
- Department: Seine-Maritime
- Arrondissement: Dieppe
- Canton: Gournay-en-Bray
- Intercommunality: CC 4 rivières

Government
  - Mayor (2026–32): Dominique Rouzé
- Area^{1}: 12.48 km^{2} (4.82 sq mi)
- Elevation: 112 m (367 ft)
- Highest elevation: 216 m (709 ft)
- Lowest elevation: 98 m (322 ft)
- Population (2023): 231
  - Density: 18.5/km^{2} (47.9/sq mi)
- Time zone: UTC+01:00 (CET)
  - Summer (DST): UTC+02:00 (CEST)
- INSEE/Postal code: 76297 /76220
- ^{1} French Land Register data, which excludes lakes, ponds, glaciers > 1 km^{2} (0.386 sq mi or 247 acres) and river estuaries.

Gancourt-Saint-Étienne (French pronunciation: [ɡɑ̃kuʁ sɛ̃.t‿etjɛn]) is a commune in the Seine-Maritime department in the Normandy region in northern France.

== Geography ==
A small farming village situated in the Pays de Bray, some 23 miles (37 km) east of Rouen, at the junction of the D916 and the D8 roads.

== Population ==
Historical population
Year	Pop.	±% p.a.
1968	313	—
1975	239	−3.78%
1982	194	−2.94%
1990	208	+0.87%
1999	211	+0.16%
2007	224	+0.75%
2012	231	+0.62%
2017	228	−0.26%
2023	231	+0.22%
Source: INSEE

== Places of interest ==
- A sixteenth century seigneurial manorhouse.
- The seventeenth-century church of St. Etienne.
- The chapel of Saint-Etienne-des-Prés
- A twelfth-century stone cross.
- The twelfth-century church of Saint-Médard at Bouricourt.

== See also ==
- Communes of the Seine-Maritime department
