= Elbeuf-en-Bray =

- Commune
- Location of Elbeuf-en-Bray
- Location within France Location within Normandy
- Coordinates: 49°29′17″N 1°38′38″E
- Country: France
- Region: Normandy
- Department: Seine-Maritime
- Arrondissement: Dieppe
- Canton: Gournay-en-Bray
- Intercommunality: CC 4 rivières

Government
  - Mayor (2026–32): Gérard Fleury
- Area^{1}: 10.65 km^{2} (4.11 sq mi)
- Elevation: 120 m (390 ft)
- Highest elevation: 220 m (720 ft)
- Lowest elevation: 98 m (322 ft)
- Population (2023): 395
  - Density: 37.1/km^{2} (96.1/sq mi)
- Time zone: UTC+01:00 (CET)
  - Summer (DST): UTC+02:00 (CEST)
- INSEE/Postal code: 76229 /76220
- ^{1} French Land Register data, which excludes lakes, ponds, glaciers > 1 km^{2} (0.386 sq mi or 247 acres) and river estuaries.

Elbeuf-en-Bray (French pronunciation: [ɛlbœf ɑ̃ bʁɛ], literally Elbeuf in Bray) is a commune in the Seine-Maritime department in the Normandy region in northern France.

== Geography ==
A farming village situated in the Pays de Bray, some 41 miles (66 km) southeast of Dieppe, at the junction of the D57 and the D204 roads.

== Population ==
Historical population
Year	Pop.	±% p.a.
1968	277	—
1975	240	−2.03%
1982	259	+1.09%
1990	314	+2.44%
1999	359	+1.50%
2007	390	+1.04%
2012	409	+0.96%
2017	415	+0.29%
2023	395	−0.82%
Source: INSEE

== Places of interest ==
- A stone cross from the seventeenth century.
- A chateau built in 1504.
- A nineteenth-century chateau.
- The church of St.Pierre, dating from the twelfth century.

== See also ==
- Communes of the Seine-Maritime department
