= Bosc-Hyons =

- Commune
- Location of Bosc-Hyons
- Location within France Location within Normandy
- Coordinates: 49°26′56″N 1°39′31″E
- Country: France
- Region: Normandy
- Department: Seine-Maritime
- Arrondissement: Dieppe
- Canton: Gournay-en-Bray
- Intercommunality: CC 4 rivières

Government
  - Mayor (2020–2026): Yves Quesney
- Area^{1}: 5.63 km^{2} (2.17 sq mi)
- Elevation: 215 m (705 ft)
- Highest elevation: 229 m (751 ft)
- Lowest elevation: 182 m (597 ft)
- Population (2023): 414
  - Density: 73.5/km^{2} (190/sq mi)
- Time zone: UTC+01:00 (CET)
  - Summer (DST): UTC+02:00 (CEST)
- INSEE/Postal code: 76124 /76220
- ^{1} French Land Register data, which excludes lakes, ponds, glaciers > 1 km^{2} (0.386 sq mi or 247 acres) and river estuaries.

Bosc-Hyons (before 1953: Boschyons) is a commune in the Seine-Maritime department in the Normandy region in north-western France.

== Geography ==
A small farming village situated in the Pays de Bray, some 25 miles (40 km) east of Rouen, at the junction of the D 916 and the D 1 roads.

== Population ==
Historical population
Year	Pop.	±% p.a.
1968	187	—
1975	216	+2.08%
1982	225	+0.58%
1990	287	+3.09%
1999	311	+0.90%
2007	367	+2.09%
2012	421	+2.78%
2017	419	−0.10%
2023	414	−0.20%
Source: INSEE

== Places of interest ==
- The church of St.Michel, dating from the twelfth century.
- An eighteenth-century stone cross.
- Menhirs

== See also ==
- Communes of the Seine-Maritime department
