= Montroty =

- Commune
- Location of Montroty
- Location within France Location within Normandy
- Coordinates: 49°26′24″N 1°40′02″E
- Country: France
- Region: Normandy
- Department: Seine-Maritime
- Arrondissement: Dieppe
- Canton: Gournay-en-Bray
- Intercommunality: CC 4 rivières

Government
  - Mayor (2026–32): Valentin Lalande
- Area^{1}: 10.79 km^{2} (4.17 sq mi)
- Elevation: 202 m (663 ft)
- Highest elevation: 221 m (725 ft)
- Lowest elevation: 110 m (360 ft)
- Population (2023): 250
  - Density: 23/km^{2} (60/sq mi)
- Time zone: UTC+01:00 (CET)
  - Summer (DST): UTC+02:00 (CEST)
- INSEE/Postal code: 76450 /76220
- ^{1} French Land Register data, which excludes lakes, ponds, glaciers > 1 km^{2} (0.386 sq mi or 247 acres) and river estuaries.

Montroty (French pronunciation: [mɔ̃ʁoti]; also Mont-Rôty) is a commune in the Seine-Maritime department in the Normandy region in northern France.

== Geography ==
A small village of farming and forestry situated in the Pays de Bray, some 24 miles (39 km) east of Rouen at the junction of the D1, D62 and the D916 roads. The commune is found at the furthest point southeast within the department, near the border with the departments of Oise and Eure.

== Population ==
Historical population
Year	Pop.	±% p.a.
1968	178	—
1975	165	−1.08%
1982	198	+2.64%
1990	188	−0.65%
1999	207	+1.08%
2007	257	+2.74%
2012	269	+0.92%
2017	273	+0.30%
2023	250	−1.46%
Source: INSEE

== Places of interest ==
- The church of St. Madeleine, dating from the eighteenth century.

== See also ==
- Communes of the Seine-Maritime department
