= Saint-Michel-d'Halescourt =

- Commune
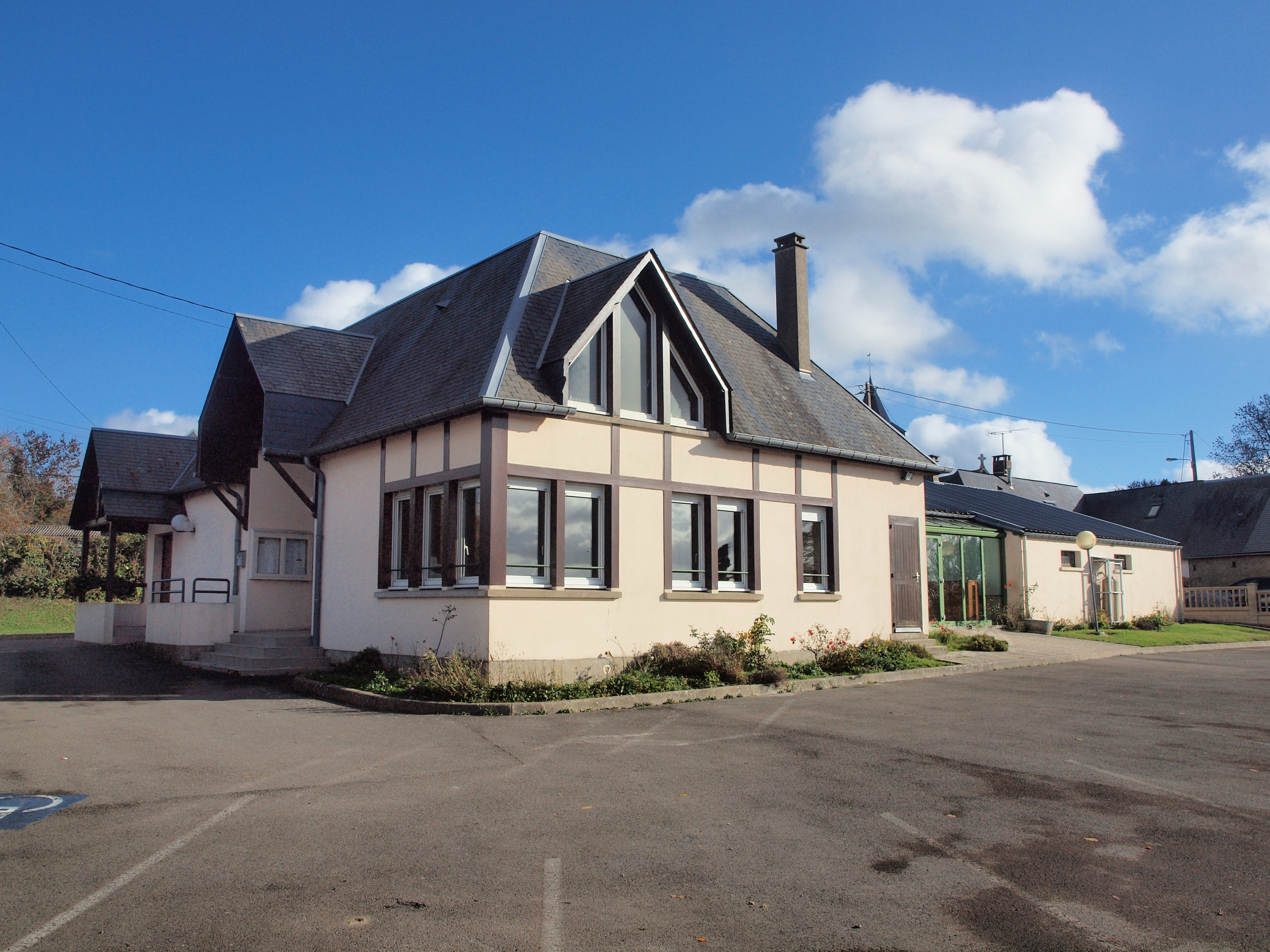
- Town hall
- Location of Saint-Michel-d'Halescourt
- Location within France Location within Normandy
- Coordinates: 49°36′33″N 1°40′04″E
- Country: France
- Region: Normandy
- Department: Seine-Maritime
- Arrondissement: Dieppe
- Canton: Gournay-en-Bray
- Intercommunality: CC 4 rivières

Government
  - Mayor (2026–32): Jean-Yves Duflos
- Area^{1}: 4.81 km^{2} (1.86 sq mi)
- Elevation: 215 m (705 ft)
- Highest elevation: 238 m (781 ft)
- Lowest elevation: 143 m (469 ft)
- Population (2023): 119
  - Density: 24.7/km^{2} (64.1/sq mi)
- Time zone: UTC+01:00 (CET)
  - Summer (DST): UTC+02:00 (CEST)
- INSEE/Postal code: 76623 /76440
- ^{1} French Land Register data, which excludes lakes, ponds, glaciers > 1 km^{2} (0.386 sq mi or 247 acres) and river estuaries.

Saint-Michel-d'Halescourt is a commune in the Seine-Maritime department in the Normandy region in northern France.

== Geography ==
A small farming village situated by the banks of the river Epte in the Pays de Bray, at the junction of the D61 and the D130 roads, some 28 miles (45 km) northeast of Rouen.

== Population ==
Historical population
Year	Pop.	±% p.a.
1968	159	—
1975	118	−4.17%
1982	84	−4.74%
1990	95	+1.55%
1999	109	+1.54%
2007	107	−0.23%
2012	97	−1.94%
2017	122	+4.69%
2023	119	−0.41%
Source: INSEE

== Places of interest ==
- The church of St. Michel, dating from the twelfth century.
- The château d'Halescourt.

== See also ==
- Communes of the Seine-Maritime department
