= Avesnes-en-Bray =

- Commune
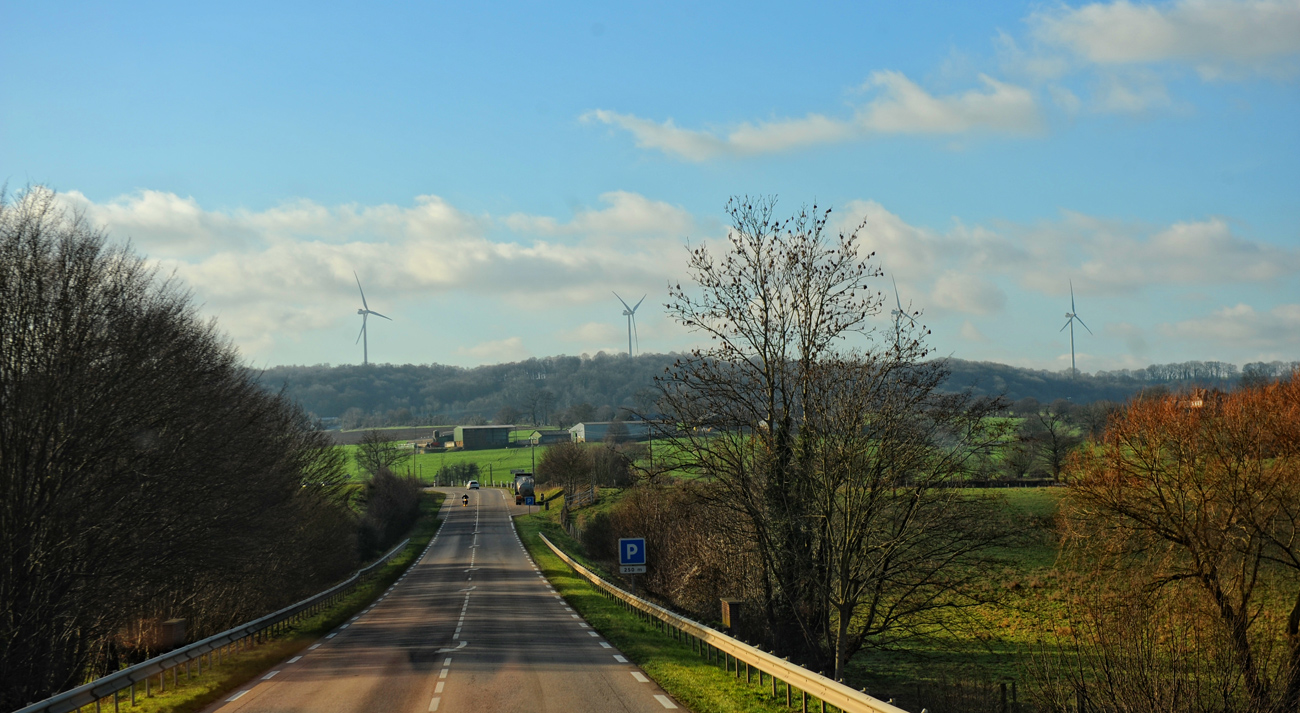
- The landscape of Avesnes-en-Bray and the windfarm
- Location of Avesnes-en-Bray
- Location within France Location within Normandy
- Coordinates: 49°28′11″N 1°40′24″E
- Country: France
- Region: Normandy
- Department: Seine-Maritime
- Arrondissement: Dieppe
- Canton: Gournay-en-Bray
- Intercommunality: CC Quatre Rivières

Government
  - Mayor (2026–32): Françoise Deschamps
- Area^{1}: 11.9 km^{2} (4.6 sq mi)
- Elevation: 136 m (446 ft)
- Highest elevation: 229 m (751 ft)
- Lowest elevation: 102 m (335 ft)
- Population (2023): 280
  - Density: 24/km^{2} (61/sq mi)
- Time zone: UTC+01:00 (CET)
  - Summer (DST): UTC+02:00 (CEST)
- INSEE/Postal code: 76048 /76220
- ^{1} French Land Register data, which excludes lakes, ponds, glaciers > 1 km^{2} (0.386 sq mi or 247 acres) and river estuaries.

Avesnes-en-Bray (French pronunciation: [avɛn ɑ̃ bʁɛ], literally Avesnes in Bray, before 1962: Avesnes) is a commune in the Seine-Maritime department in the Normandy region in northern France.

== Geography ==
A small farming village in the Pays de Bray, situated some 28 miles (45 km) east of Rouen, at the junction of the N31 and D221 roads.

== Population ==
Historical population
Year	Pop.	±% p.a.
1968	275	—
1975	249	−1.41%
1982	205	−2.74%
1990	234	+1.67%
1999	256	+1.00%
2007	313	+2.54%
2012	319	+0.38%
2017	301	−1.15%
2023	280	−1.20%
Source: INSEE

== Places of interest ==
- The eighteenth century church of St.Martin.
- Some Merovingian tombs and objects, found in the 19th century.

== See also ==
- Communes of the Seine-Maritime department
