= Mésangueville =

- Commune
- Coat of arms
- Location of Mésangueville
- Location within France Location within Normandy
- Coordinates: 49°32′49″N 1°33′36″E
- Country: France
- Region: Normandy
- Department: Seine-Maritime
- Arrondissement: Dieppe
- Canton: Gournay-en-Bray
- Intercommunality: CC 4 rivières

Government
  - Mayor (2026–32): Gilbert Coutard
- Area^{1}: 10.55 km^{2} (4.07 sq mi)
- Elevation: 160 m (520 ft)
- Highest elevation: 185 m (607 ft)
- Lowest elevation: 114 m (374 ft)
- Population (2023): 154
  - Density: 14.6/km^{2} (37.8/sq mi)
- Time zone: UTC+01:00 (CET)
  - Summer (DST): UTC+02:00 (CEST)
- INSEE/Postal code: 76426 /76780
- ^{1} French Land Register data, which excludes lakes, ponds, glaciers > 1 km^{2} (0.386 sq mi or 247 acres) and river estuaries.

Mésangueville (French pronunciation: [mezɑ̃ɡvil]) is a commune in the Seine-Maritime department in the Normandy region in northern France.

== Geography ==
A small forestry and farming village situated in the valley of the river Epte in the Pays de Bray, some 23 miles (37 km) northeast of Rouen at the junction of the D128 with the D41.

== Heraldry ==
Arms of Mésangueville	The arms of Mésangueville are blazoned : Or, on an inescutcheon, a tit argent, all between 4 lozenges 1,2,1 sable. (these lozenges are rotated squares) Canting arms (a 'tit' (Parus spp.) is a mésange in French).

== Population ==
Historical population
Year	Pop.	±% p.a.
1968	201	—
1975	161	−3.12%
1982	137	−2.28%
1990	137	+0.00%
1999	143	+0.48%
2007	154	+0.93%
2012	179	+3.05%
2017	164	−1.74%
2023	154	−1.04%
Source: INSEE

== Places of interest ==
- The church of St.Nicolas, dating from the thirteenth century.

== See also ==
- Communes of the Seine-Maritime department
