= Bézancourt =

- Commune
- Coat of arms
- Location of Bézancourt
- Location within France Location within Normandy
- Coordinates: 49°26′37″N 1°37′35″E
- Country: France
- Region: Normandy
- Department: Seine-Maritime
- Arrondissement: Dieppe
- Canton: Gournay-en-Bray
- Intercommunality: CC 4 rivières

Government
  - Mayor (2026–32): Jean-Marie Nirlo
- Area^{1}: 17.59 km^{2} (6.79 sq mi)
- Elevation: 186 m (610 ft)
- Highest elevation: 211 m (692 ft)
- Lowest elevation: 118 m (387 ft)
- Population (2023): 358
  - Density: 20.4/km^{2} (52.7/sq mi)
- Time zone: UTC+01:00 (CET)
  - Summer (DST): UTC+02:00 (CEST)
- INSEE/Postal code: 76093 /76220
- ^{1} French Land Register data, which excludes lakes, ponds, glaciers > 1 km^{2} (0.386 sq mi or 247 acres) and river estuaries.

Bézancourt (French pronunciation: [bezɑ̃kuʁ]) is a commune in the Seine-Maritime department in the Normandy region in northern France.

== Geography ==
A forestry and farming village situated in the Pays de Bray, some 25 miles (40 km) east of Rouen, at the junction of the D62 and the D401 roads.

== Population ==
Historical population
Year	Pop.	±% p.a.
1968	272	—
1975	255	−0.92%
1982	261	+0.33%
1990	238	−1.15%
1999	248	+0.46%
2007	284	+1.71%
2012	338	+3.54%
2017	352	+0.82%
2023	358	+0.28%
Source: INSEE

== Places of interest ==
- The church of St. Aubin, dating from the sixteenth century.
- A menhir called the “Pierre-qui-Tourne” (turning stone).
- A château dating from the seventeenth century.
- The château du Landel.

== See also ==
- Communes of the Seine-Maritime department
