= Saumont-la-Poterie =

- Commune
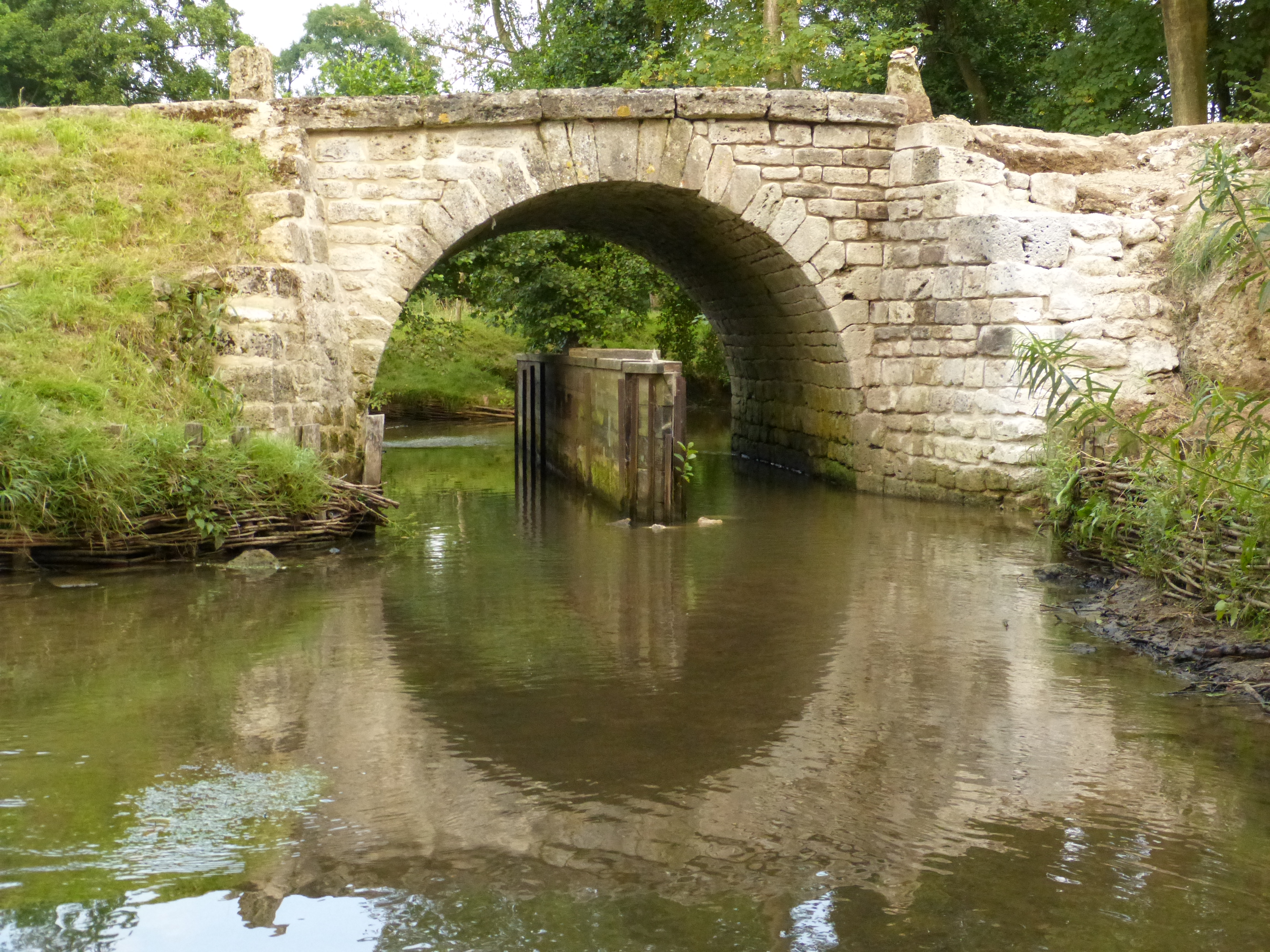
- The Pont de Coq in Saumont-la-Poterie
- Location of Saumont-la-Poterie
- Location within France Location within Normandy
- Coordinates: 49°34′43″N 1°37′06″E
- Country: France
- Region: Normandy
- Department: Seine-Maritime
- Arrondissement: Dieppe
- Canton: Gournay-en-Bray
- Intercommunality: CC 4 rivières

Government
  - Mayor (2026–32): Nadine Troussé
- Area^{1}: 15.94 km^{2} (6.15 sq mi)
- Elevation: 133 m (436 ft)
- Highest elevation: 193 m (633 ft)
- Lowest elevation: 109 m (358 ft)
- Population (2023): 412
  - Density: 25.8/km^{2} (66.9/sq mi)
- Time zone: UTC+01:00 (CET)
  - Summer (DST): UTC+02:00 (CEST)
- INSEE/Postal code: 76666 /76440
- ^{1} French Land Register data, which excludes lakes, ponds, glaciers > 1 km^{2} (0.386 sq mi or 247 acres) and river estuaries.

Saumont-la-Poterie (French pronunciation: [somɔ̃ la pɔtʁi]) is a commune in the Seine-Maritime department in the Normandy region in northern France.

== Geography ==
A farming village situated in the valley of the Epte river in the Pays de Bray, some 24 miles (39 km) northeast of Rouen, at the junction of the D915, D41 and D241 roads.

== Population ==
Historical population
Year	Pop.	±% p.a.
1968	452	—
1975	363	−3.08%
1982	312	−2.14%
1990	365	+1.98%
1999	382	+0.51%
2007	388	+0.19%
2012	400	+0.61%
2017	412	+0.59%
2023	412	+0.00%
Source: INSEE

== Places of interest ==
- An ancient bridge.
- The church of St. Denis, dating from the sixteenth century.

== See also ==
- Communes of the Seine-Maritime department
