= Haussez =

- Commune
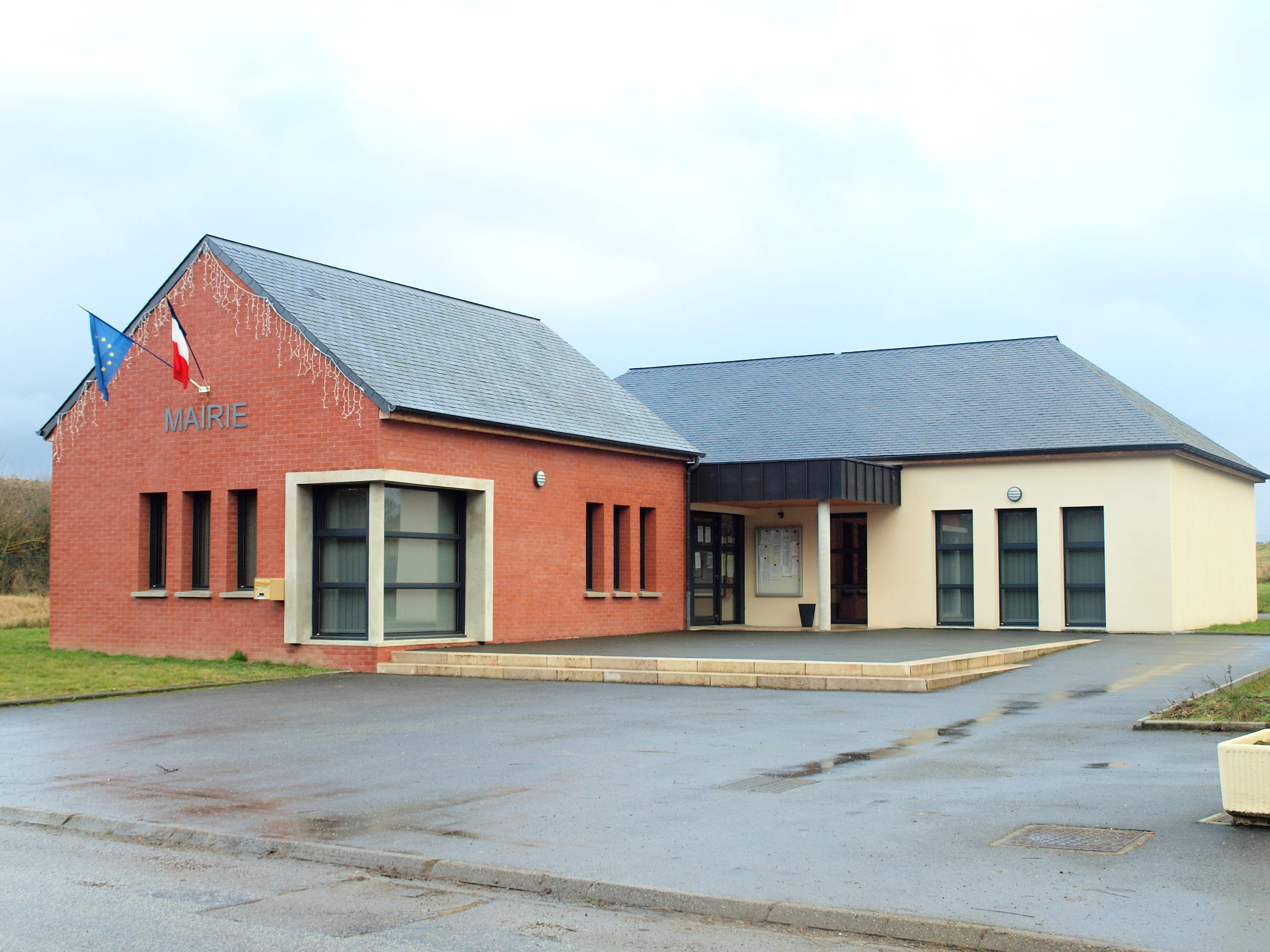
- The town hall in Haussez
- Location of Haussez
- Location within France Location within Normandy
- Coordinates: 49°35′00″N 1°40′02″E
- Country: France
- Region: Normandy
- Department: Seine-Maritime
- Arrondissement: Dieppe
- Canton: Gournay-en-Bray
- Intercommunality: CC 4 rivières

Government
  - Mayor (2020–2026): Marcel Coaillet
- Area^{1}: 13.15 km^{2} (5.08 sq mi)
- Elevation: 127 m (417 ft)
- Highest elevation: 217 m (712 ft)
- Lowest elevation: 110 m (360 ft)
- Population (2023): 274
  - Density: 20.8/km^{2} (54.0/sq mi)
- Time zone: UTC+01:00 (CET)
  - Summer (DST): UTC+02:00 (CEST)
- INSEE/Postal code: 76345 /76440
- ^{1} French Land Register data, which excludes lakes, ponds, glaciers > 1 km^{2} (0.386 sq mi or 247 acres) and river estuaries.

Haussez (French pronunciation: [ose]) is a commune in the Seine-Maritime department in the Normandy region in northern France.

== Geography ==
A farming village situated by the banks of the Epte river in the Pays de Bray, some 41 miles (66 km) southeast of Dieppe at the junction of the D41, D120 and D130 roads. The commune borders the département of Oise.

== Population ==
Historical population
| Year | Pop. | ±% p.a. |
|---|---|---|
| 1968 | 370 | — |
| 1975 | 287 | −3.56% |
| 1982 | 265 | −1.13% |
| 1990 | 237 | −1.39% |
| 1999 | 233 | −0.19% |
| 2007 | 273 | +2.00% |
| 2012 | 275 | +0.15% |
| 2017 | 278 | +0.22% |
| 2023 | 274 | −0.24% |
Source: INSEE

== Places of interest ==
- A nineteenth century chateau.
- The church of St.Martin, dating from the twelfth century.
- The church of St.Pierre.

== See also ==
- Communes of the Seine-Maritime department
