= Rouvray-Catillon =

- Commune
- Location of Rouvray-Catillon
- Location within France Location within Normandy
- Coordinates: 49°34′25″N 1°28′59″E
- Country: France
- Region: Normandy
- Department: Seine-Maritime
- Arrondissement: Dieppe
- Canton: Gournay-en-Bray
- Intercommunality: CC 4 rivières

Government
  - Mayor (2026–32): Mylène Gilles
- Area^{1}: 12.22 km^{2} (4.72 sq mi)
- Elevation: 121 m (397 ft)
- Highest elevation: 225 m (738 ft)
- Lowest elevation: 112 m (367 ft)
- Population (2023): 223
  - Density: 18.2/km^{2} (47.3/sq mi)
- Time zone: UTC+01:00 (CET)
  - Summer (DST): UTC+02:00 (CEST)
- INSEE/Postal code: 76544 /76440
- ^{1} French Land Register data, which excludes lakes, ponds, glaciers > 1 km^{2} (0.386 sq mi or 247 acres) and river estuaries.

Rouvray-Catillon (French pronunciation: [ʁuvʁɛ katijɔ̃]) is a commune in the Seine-Maritime department in the Normandy region in northern France.

== Geography ==
A village of farming and associated light industry situated by the banks of the Andelle river in the Pays de Bray at the junction of the D61, D13 and the D118 roads, some 20 miles (32 km) northeast of Rouen.

== Population ==
Historical population
| Year | Pop. | ±% p.a. |
|---|---|---|
| 1968 | 258 | — |
| 1975 | 210 | −2.90% |
| 1982 | 216 | +0.40% |
| 1990 | 211 | −0.29% |
| 1999 | 195 | −0.87% |
| 2007 | 181 | −0.93% |
| 2012 | 231 | +5.00% |
| 2017 | 228 | −0.26% |
| 2023 | 223 | −0.37% |
Source: INSEE

== Places of interest ==
- The eighteenth-century church of St. Martin.
- The church of Notre-Dame, dating from the eighteenth century.
- A museum in a 16th-century manorhouse.
- A seventeenth-century château.
- The chapel of St. Samson, dating from the nineteenth century.

== See also ==
- Communes of the Seine-Maritime department
