= La Haye, Seine-Maritime =

La Haye
- Commune
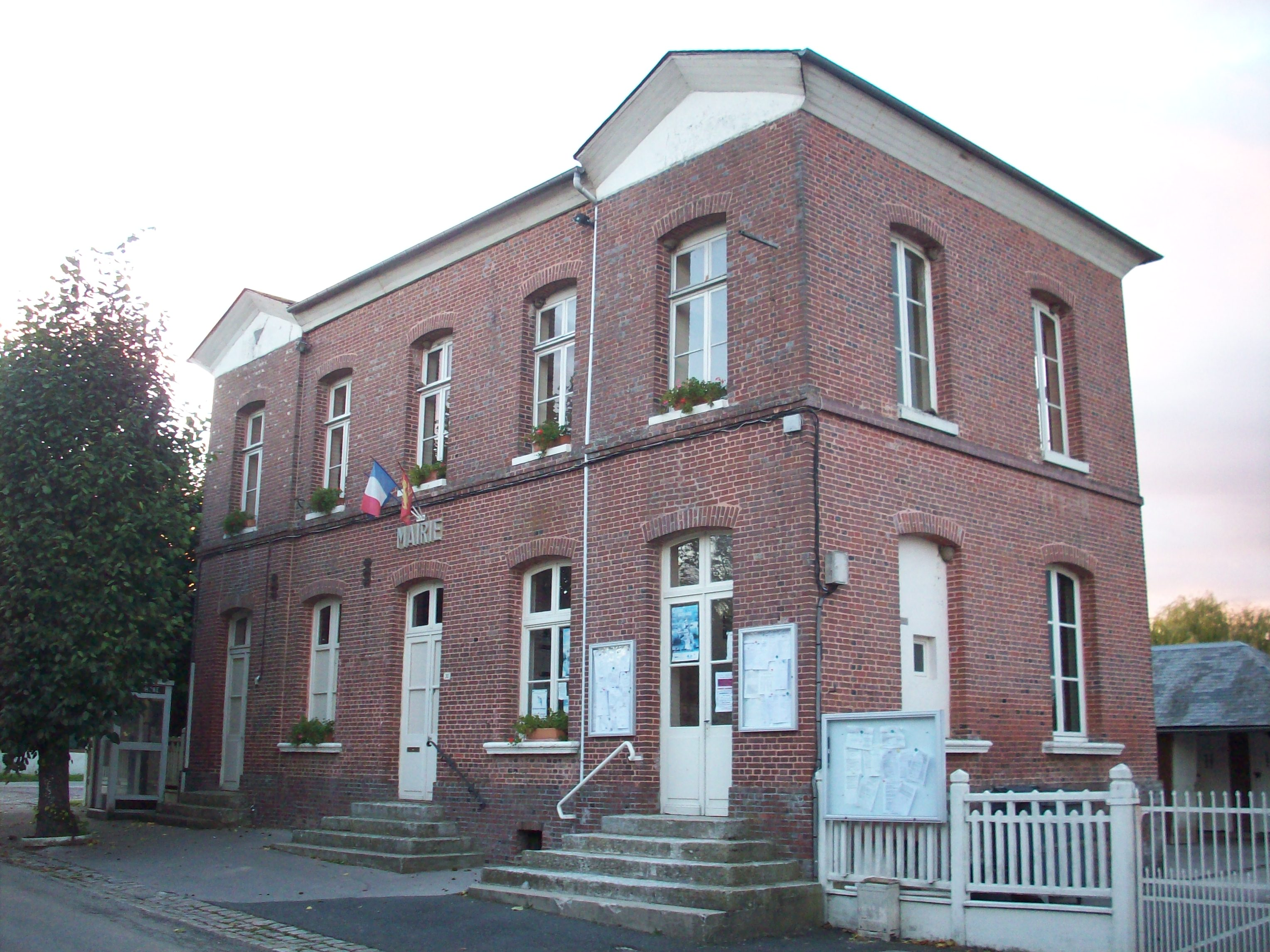
- The town hall in La Haye
- Location of La Haye
- Location within France Location within Normandy
- Coordinates: 49°28′00″N 1°26′33″E
- Country: France
- Region: Normandy
- Department: Seine-Maritime
- Arrondissement: Dieppe
- Canton: Gournay-en-Bray
- Intercommunality: CC 4 rivières

Government
  - Mayor (2026–32): Jean-Marc Gaillon
- Area^{1}: 6.74 km^{2} (2.60 sq mi)
- Elevation: 174 m (571 ft)
- Highest elevation: 177 m (581 ft)
- Lowest elevation: 75 m (246 ft)
- Population (2023): 366
  - Density: 54.3/km^{2} (141/sq mi)
- Time zone: UTC+01:00 (CET)
  - Summer (DST): UTC+02:00 (CEST)
- INSEE/Postal code: 76352 /76780
- ^{1} French Land Register data, which excludes lakes, ponds, glaciers > 1 km^{2} (0.386 sq mi or 247 acres) and river estuaries.

La Haye (French pronunciation: [la ɛ]) is a commune in the Seine-Maritime department in the Normandy region in northern France.

== Geography ==
A forestry and farming village situated by the banks of the Andelle river in the Pays de Bray, some 17 miles (27 km) east of Rouen at the junction of the N31 and the D413 roads.

== Population ==
Historical population
| Year | Pop. | ±% p.a. |
|---|---|---|
| 1968 | 213 | — |
| 1975 | 204 | −0.61% |
| 1982 | 222 | +1.22% |
| 1990 | 218 | −0.23% |
| 1999 | 263 | +2.11% |
| 2007 | 248 | −0.73% |
| 2012 | 333 | +6.07% |
| 2017 | 381 | +2.73% |
| 2023 | 366 | −0.67% |
Source: INSEE

== Places of interest ==
- The church of St.Peter & St.Paul, dating from the twelfth century.

== See also ==
- Communes of the Seine-Maritime department
