= Le Mesnil-Lieubray =

- Commune
- Coat of arms
- Location of Le Mesnil-Lieubray
- Location within France Location within Normandy
- Coordinates: 49°31′21″N 1°30′30″E
- Country: France
- Region: Normandy
- Department: Seine-Maritime
- Arrondissement: Dieppe
- Canton: Gournay-en-Bray
- Intercommunality: CC 4 rivières

Government
  - Mayor (2026–32): Jérôme Grisel
- Area^{1}: 5.94 km^{2} (2.29 sq mi)
- Elevation: 115 m (377 ft)
- Highest elevation: 214 m (702 ft)
- Lowest elevation: 90 m (300 ft)
- Population (2023): 92
  - Density: 15/km^{2} (40/sq mi)
- Time zone: UTC+01:00 (CET)
  - Summer (DST): UTC+02:00 (CEST)
- INSEE/Postal code: 76431 /76780
- ^{1} French Land Register data, which excludes lakes, ponds, glaciers > 1 km^{2} (0.386 sq mi or 247 acres) and river estuaries.

Le Mesnil-Lieubray is a commune in the Seine-Maritime department in the Normandy region in northern France.

== Geography ==
A small farming village situated by the banks of the Andelle river in the Pays de Bray, some 17 miles (27 km) northeast of Rouen at the junction of the D921 and the D57 roads.

== Heraldry ==
Arms of Le Mesnil-Lieubray	The arms of Le Mesnil-Lieubray are blazoned : Quarterly 1: Gules, a bunch of grapes slipped and lived Or; 2: Azure, a saw blade argent; 3: Azure, 2 barrulets argent; and 4: Gules, an apple slipped and leaved Or; overall on an inescutcheon Or, a latin cross of 9 fusils gules. (The saw blade here is a fess indented on the bottom side only)

== Population ==
Historical population
Year	Pop.	±% p.a.
1968	114	—
1975	106	−1.03%
1982	105	−0.14%
1990	82	−3.04%
1999	65	−2.55%
2007	95	+4.86%
2012	102	+1.43%
2017	99	−0.60%
2023	92	−1.21%
Source: INSEE

== Places of interest ==
- The church of St. Geneviève, dating from the thirteenth century.
- A fourteenth-century fortified manorhouse called the Château de la Reine Blanche (allegedly owned by Asif Ali Zardari, President of Pakistan).

== See also ==
- Communes of the Seine-Maritime department
