= Le Thil-Riberpré =

- Commune
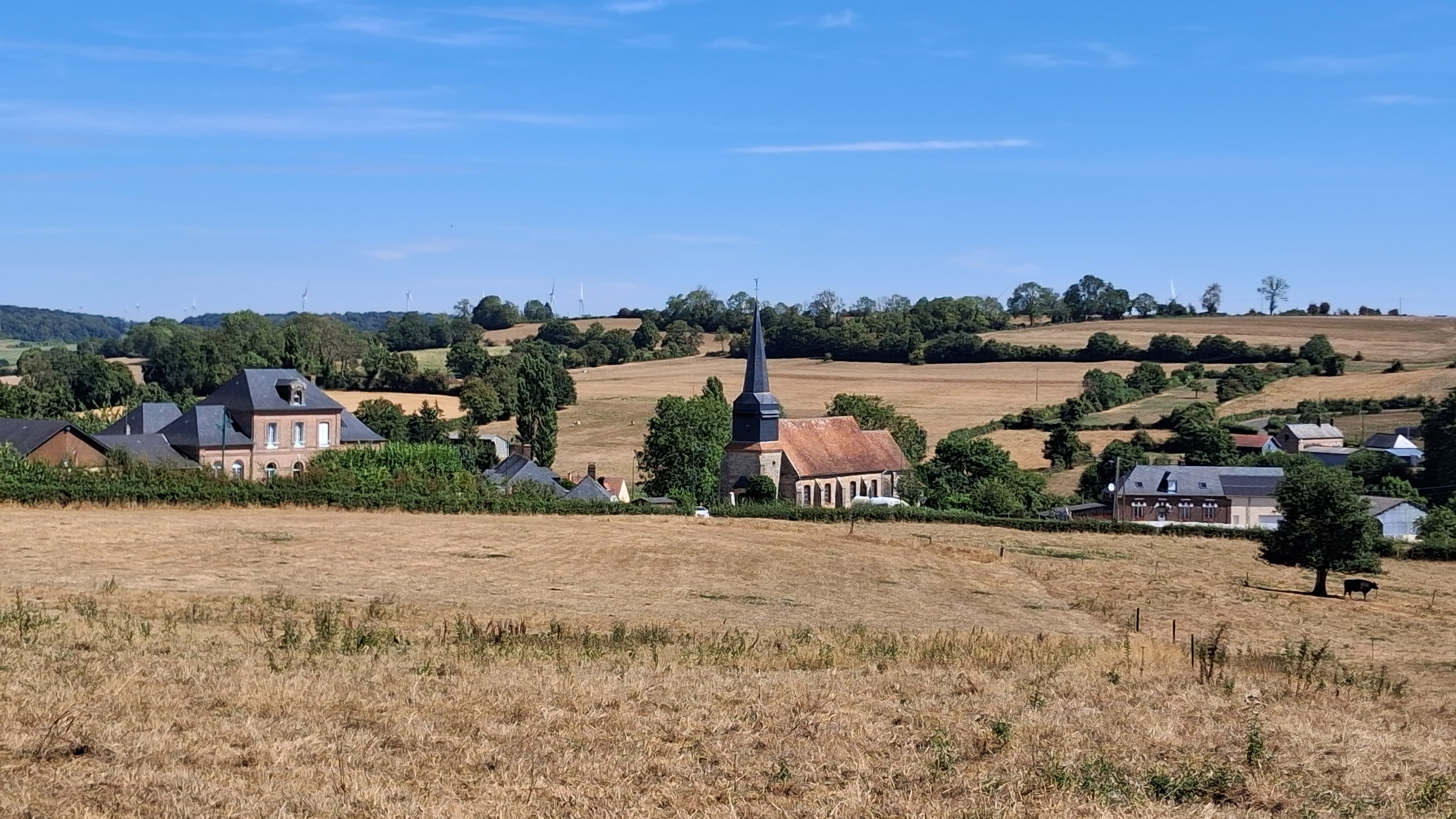
- The village in August 2026, with the town hall (left) and the church of Notre-Dame.
- Location of Le Thil-Riberpré
- Location within France Location within Normandy
- Coordinates: 49°38′38″N 1°34′47″E
- Country: France
- Region: Normandy
- Department: Seine-Maritime
- Arrondissement: Dieppe
- Canton: Gournay-en-Bray
- Intercommunality: CC 4 rivières

Government
  - Mayor (2026–32): Francis Bourguignon
- Area^{1}: 10.09 km^{2} (3.90 sq mi)
- Elevation: 199 m (653 ft)
- Highest elevation: 239 m (784 ft)
- Lowest elevation: 143 m (469 ft)
- Population (2023): 241
  - Density: 23.9/km^{2} (61.9/sq mi)
- Time zone: UTC+01:00 (CET)
  - Summer (DST): UTC+02:00 (CEST)
- INSEE/Postal code: 76691 /76440
- ^{1} French Land Register data, which excludes lakes, ponds, glaciers > 1 km^{2} (0.386 sq mi or 247 acres) and river estuaries.

Le Thil-Riberpré is a commune in the Seine-Maritime department in the Normandy region in northern France.

== Geography ==
A farming commune situated in the Pays de Bray, some 35 miles (56 km) southeast of Dieppe at the junction of the D83 and the D120 roads. It includes the village Le Thil-en-Bray and the smaller settlement Riberpré.

== Population ==
Historical population
Year	Pop.	±% p.a.
1968	229	—
1975	202	−1.78%
1982	192	−0.72%
1990	204	+0.76%
1999	183	−1.20%
2007	212	+1.86%
2012	229	+1.55%
2017	219	−0.89%
2023	241	+1.61%
Source: INSEE

== Places of interest ==
- The church of Notre-Dame, dating from the thirteenth century.
- Traces of a castle.

== See also ==
- Communes of the Seine-Maritime department
