= La Chapelle-Saint-Ouen =

- Commune
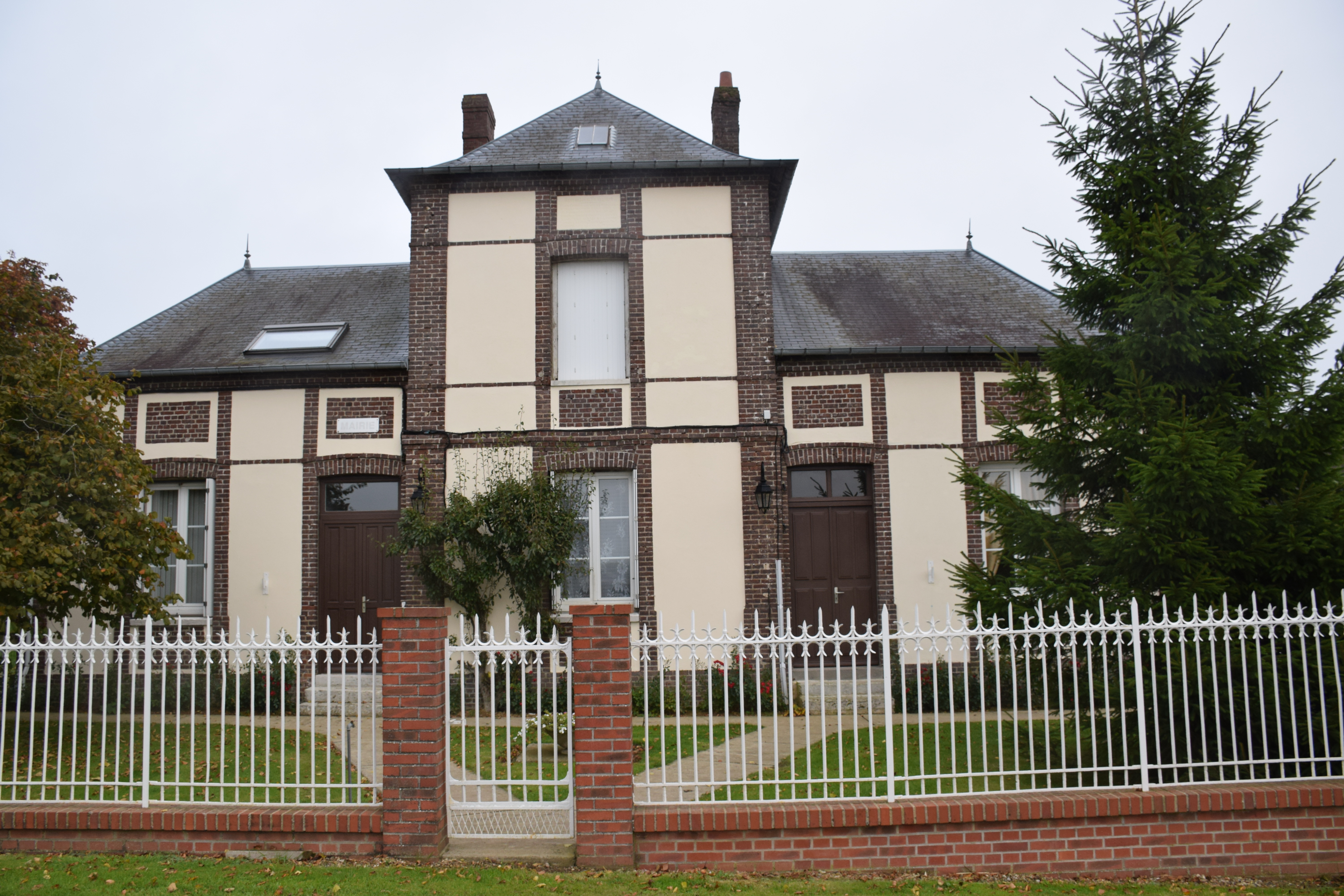
- The town hall in La Chapelle-Saint-Ouen
- Location of La Chapelle-Saint-Ouen
- Location within France Location within Normandy
- Coordinates: 49°32′10″N 1°26′07″E
- Country: France
- Region: Normandy
- Department: Seine-Maritime
- Arrondissement: Dieppe
- Canton: Gournay-en-Bray
- Intercommunality: CC 4 rivières

Government
  - Mayor (2026–32): Dominique Camus
- Area^{1}: 7.85 km^{2} (3.03 sq mi)
- Elevation: 190 m (620 ft)
- Highest elevation: 219 m (719 ft)
- Lowest elevation: 94 m (308 ft)
- Population (2023): 147
  - Density: 18.7/km^{2} (48.5/sq mi)
- Time zone: UTC+01:00 (CET)
  - Summer (DST): UTC+02:00 (CEST)
- INSEE/Postal code: 76171 /76780
- ^{1} French Land Register data, which excludes lakes, ponds, glaciers > 1 km^{2} (0.386 sq mi or 247 acres) and river estuaries.

La Chapelle-Saint-Ouen (French pronunciation: [la ʃapɛl sɛ̃.t‿wɛ̃]) is a commune in the Seine-Maritime department in the Normandy region in northern France.

== Geography ==
A very small farming village situated in the Pays de Bray, some 17 miles (27 km) northeast of Rouen at the junction of the D38 and the D57 roads.

== Population ==
Historical population
Year	Pop.	±% p.a.
1968	105	—
1975	78	−4.16%
1982	71	−1.33%
1990	76	+0.85%
1999	72	−0.60%
2007	89	+2.69%
2012	102	+2.76%
2017	130	+4.97%
2023	147	+2.07%
Source: INSEE

== Places of interest ==
- An old manorhouse.
- The sixteenth-century château de Bruquedalle.
- The church of St.Ouen, dating from the eighteenth century.
- The church of St.Jean-Baptiste, dating from the eighteenth century.

== See also ==
- Communes of the Seine-Maritime department
