= La Ferté-Saint-Samson =

- Commune
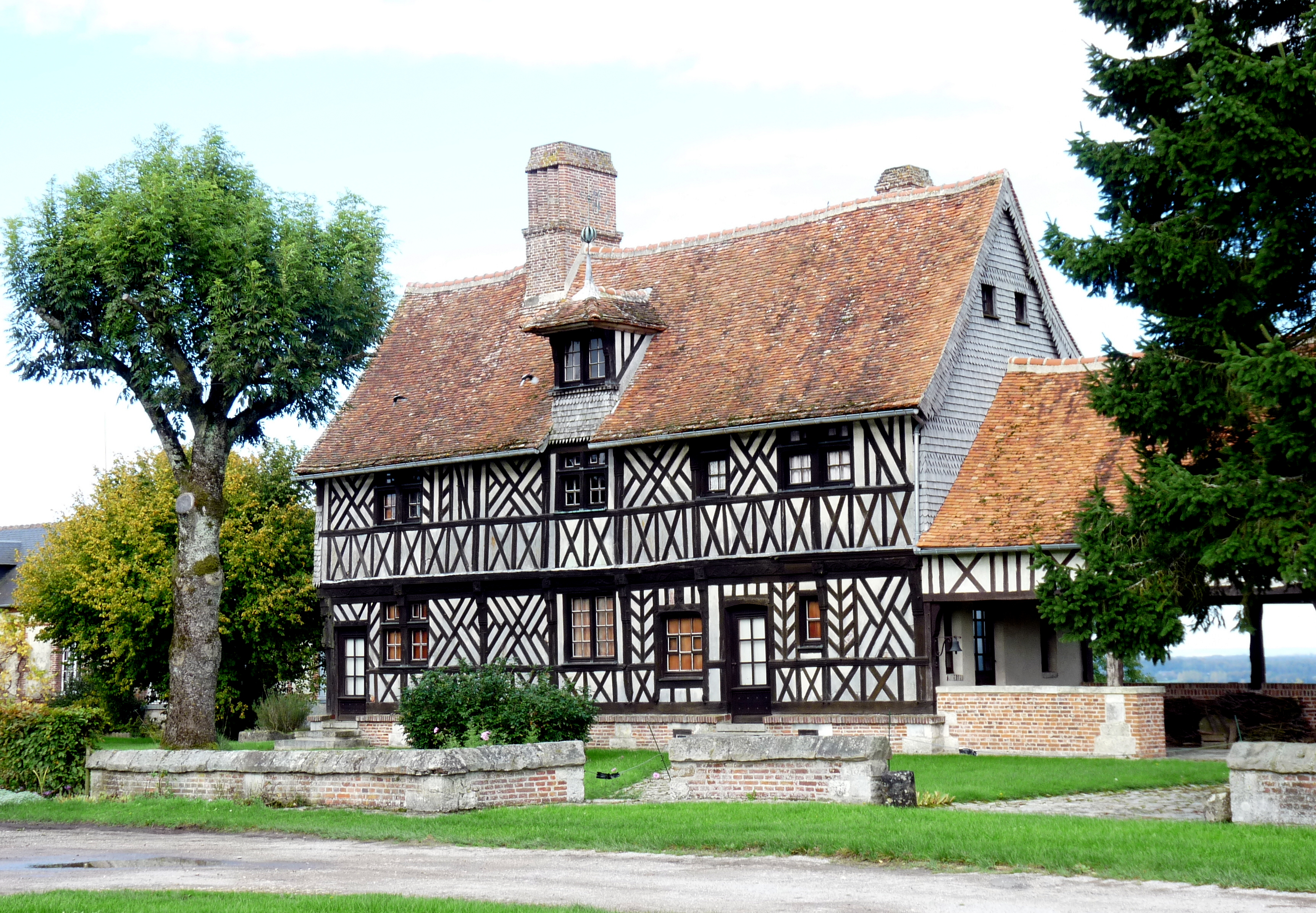
- The house of Henry IV in La Ferté-Saint-Samson

- Coat of arms
- Location of La Ferté-Saint-Samson
- Location within France Location within Normandy
- Coordinates: 49°34′44″N 1°31′32″E
- Country: France
- Region: Normandy
- Department: Seine-Maritime
- Arrondissement: Dieppe
- Canton: Gournay-en-Bray
- Intercommunality: CC 4 rivières

Government
  - Mayor (2026–32): Maurice Defromerie
- Area^{1}: 19.05 km^{2} (7.36 sq mi)
- Elevation: 190 m (620 ft)
- Highest elevation: 196 m (643 ft)
- Lowest elevation: 119 m (390 ft)
- Population (2023): 449
  - Density: 23.6/km^{2} (61.0/sq mi)
- Time zone: UTC+01:00 (CET)
  - Summer (DST): UTC+02:00 (CEST)
- INSEE/Postal code: 76261 /76440
- ^{1} French Land Register data, which excludes lakes, ponds, glaciers > 1 km^{2} (0.386 sq mi or 247 acres) and river estuaries.

La Ferté-Saint-Samson is a commune in the Seine-Maritime department in the Normandy region in northern France.

== Geography ==
A forestry and farming village situated in the Pays de Bray, some 39 miles (63 km) southeast of Dieppe at the junction of the D61, the D21 and the D921 roads.

== Population ==
Historical population
Year	Pop.	±% p.a.
1968	447	—
1975	372	−2.59%
1982	319	−2.17%
1990	333	+0.54%
1999	341	+0.26%
2007	425	+2.79%
2012	460	+1.60%
2017	466	+0.26%
2023	449	−0.62%
Source: INSEE

== Places of interest ==
- The motte and ruins of a feudal castle.
- An old house dating from the sixteenth century.
- A nineteenth-century château.
- The thirteenth-century chapel of St.Samson.
- The church of St.Pierre, dating from the tenth century.

== See also ==
- Communes of the Seine-Maritime department
