= Hodeng-Hodenger =

- Commune
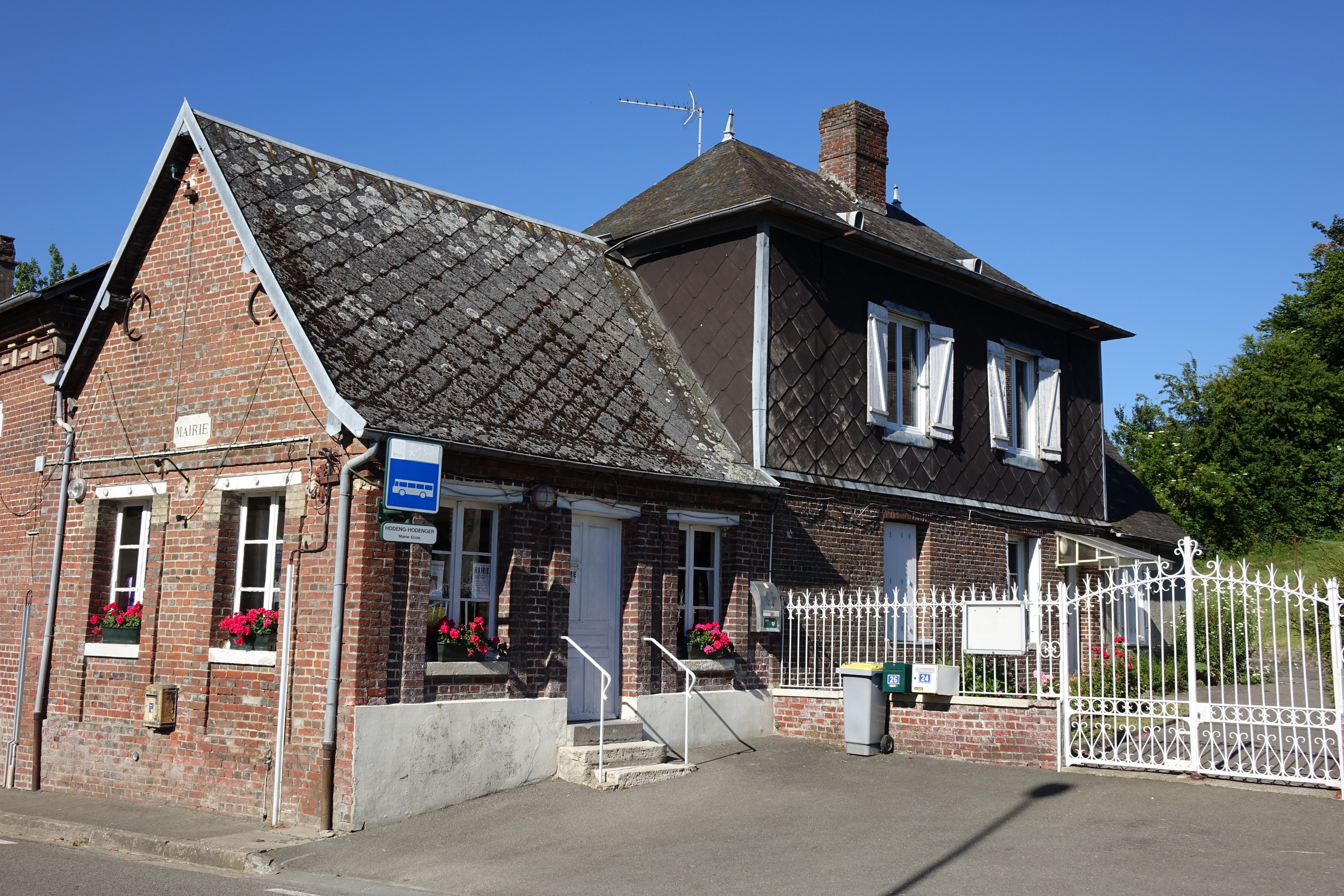
- The town hall in Hodeng-Hodenger
- Location of Hodeng-Hodenger
- Location within France Location within Normandy
- Coordinates: 49°31′44″N 1°34′10″E
- Country: France
- Region: Normandy
- Department: Seine-Maritime
- Arrondissement: Dieppe
- Canton: Gournay-en-Bray
- Intercommunality: CC 4 rivières

Government
  - Mayor (2026–32): Jean-Claude Delwarde
- Area^{1}: 11.54 km^{2} (4.46 sq mi)
- Elevation: 157 m (515 ft)
- Highest elevation: 197 m (646 ft)
- Lowest elevation: 107 m (351 ft)
- Population (2023): 294
  - Density: 25.5/km^{2} (66.0/sq mi)
- Time zone: UTC+01:00 (CET)
  - Summer (DST): UTC+02:00 (CEST)
- INSEE/Postal code: 76364 /76780
- ^{1} French Land Register data, which excludes lakes, ponds, glaciers > 1 km^{2} (0.386 sq mi or 247 acres) and river estuaries.

Hodeng-Hodenger is a commune in the Seine-Maritime department in the Normandy region in northern France.

== Geography ==
A small forestry and farming village situated in the Pays de Bray, some 20 miles (32 km) northeast of Rouen at the junction of the D21, the D241 and the D145 road.

== Population ==
Historical population
Year	Pop.	±% p.a.
1968	273	—
1975	223	−2.85%
1982	217	−0.39%
1990	228	+0.62%
1999	202	−1.34%
2007	248	+2.60%
2012	279	+2.38%
2017	279	+0.00%
2023	294	+0.88%
Source: INSEE

== Places of interest ==
- The church of Notre-Dame at Hodenger, dating from the eleventh century.
- The church of St. Denis, dating from the sixteenth century.

== See also ==
- Communes of the Seine-Maritime department
