= Mauquenchy =

- Commune
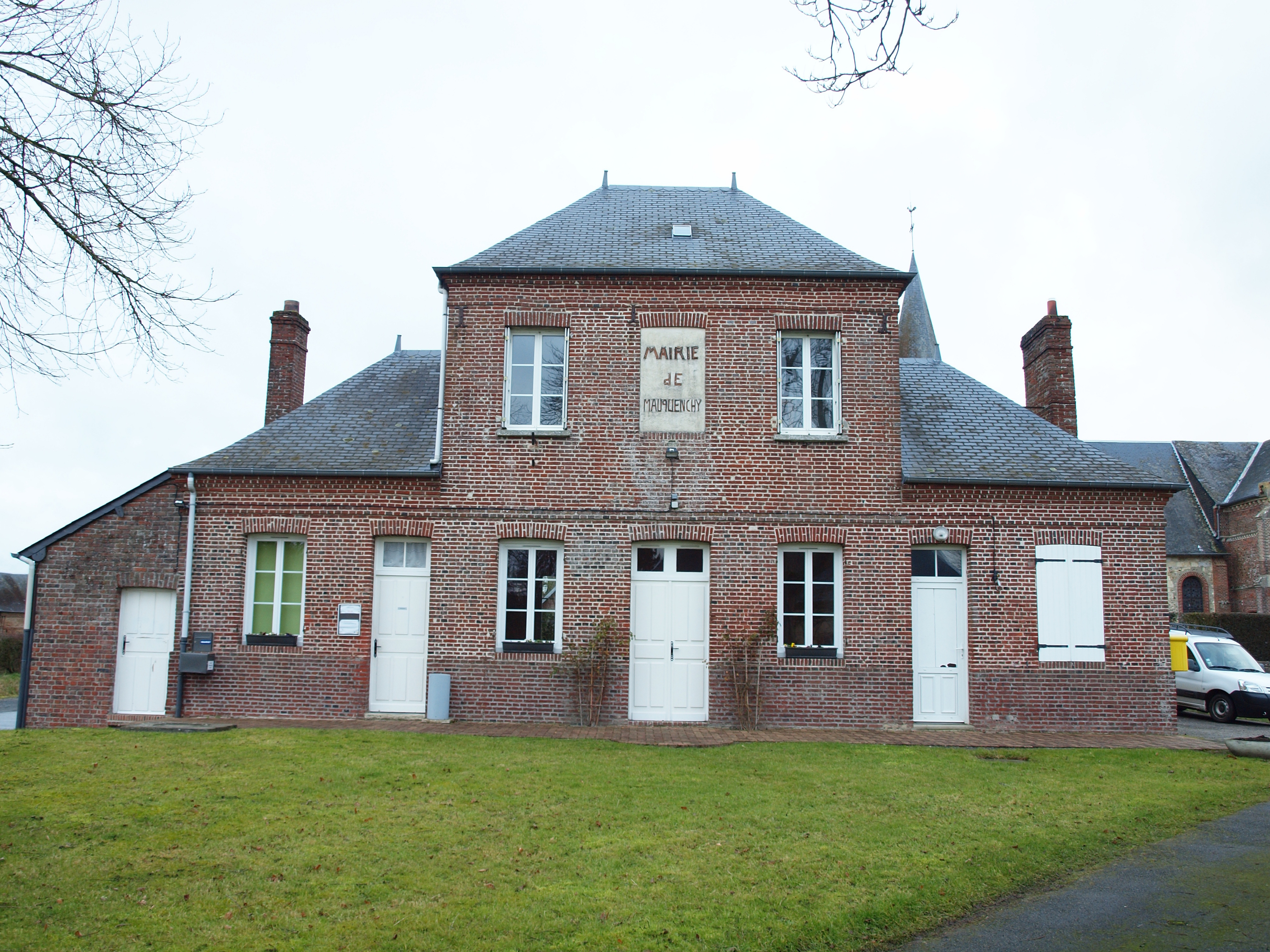
- The town hall in Mauquenchy
- Location of Mauquenchy
- Location within France Location within Normandy
- Coordinates: 49°36′16″N 1°28′08″E
- Country: France
- Region: Normandy
- Department: Seine-Maritime
- Arrondissement: Dieppe
- Canton: Gournay-en-Bray
- Intercommunality: CC 4 rivières

Government
  - Mayor (2026–32): Pascal Mariette
- Area^{1}: 12.64 km^{2} (4.88 sq mi)
- Elevation: 161 m (528 ft)
- Highest elevation: 236 m (774 ft)
- Lowest elevation: 118 m (387 ft)
- Population (2023): 365
  - Density: 28.9/km^{2} (74.8/sq mi)
- Time zone: UTC+01:00 (CET)
  - Summer (DST): UTC+02:00 (CEST)
- INSEE/Postal code: 76420 /76440
- ^{1} French Land Register data, which excludes lakes, ponds, glaciers > 1 km^{2} (0.386 sq mi or 247 acres) and river estuaries.

Mauquenchy (French pronunciation: [mokɑ̃ʃi]) is a commune in the Seine-Maritime department in the Normandy region in northern France.

== Geography ==
A farming village situated by the banks of the river Andelle in the Pays de Bray, some 35 miles (56 km) southeast of Dieppe at the junction of the D102 and the D919 roads.

== Population ==
Historical population
Year	Pop.	±% p.a.
1968	271	—
1975	257	−0.75%
1982	261	+0.22%
1990	266	+0.24%
1999	276	+0.41%
2007	309	+1.42%
2012	339	+1.87%
2017	352	+0.76%
2023	365	+0.61%
Source: INSEE

== Places of interest ==
- The church of St.Martin, dating from the eleventh century.
- The hippodrome (race-track).

== See also ==
- Communes of the Seine-Maritime department
