= Roncherolles-en-Bray =

- Commune
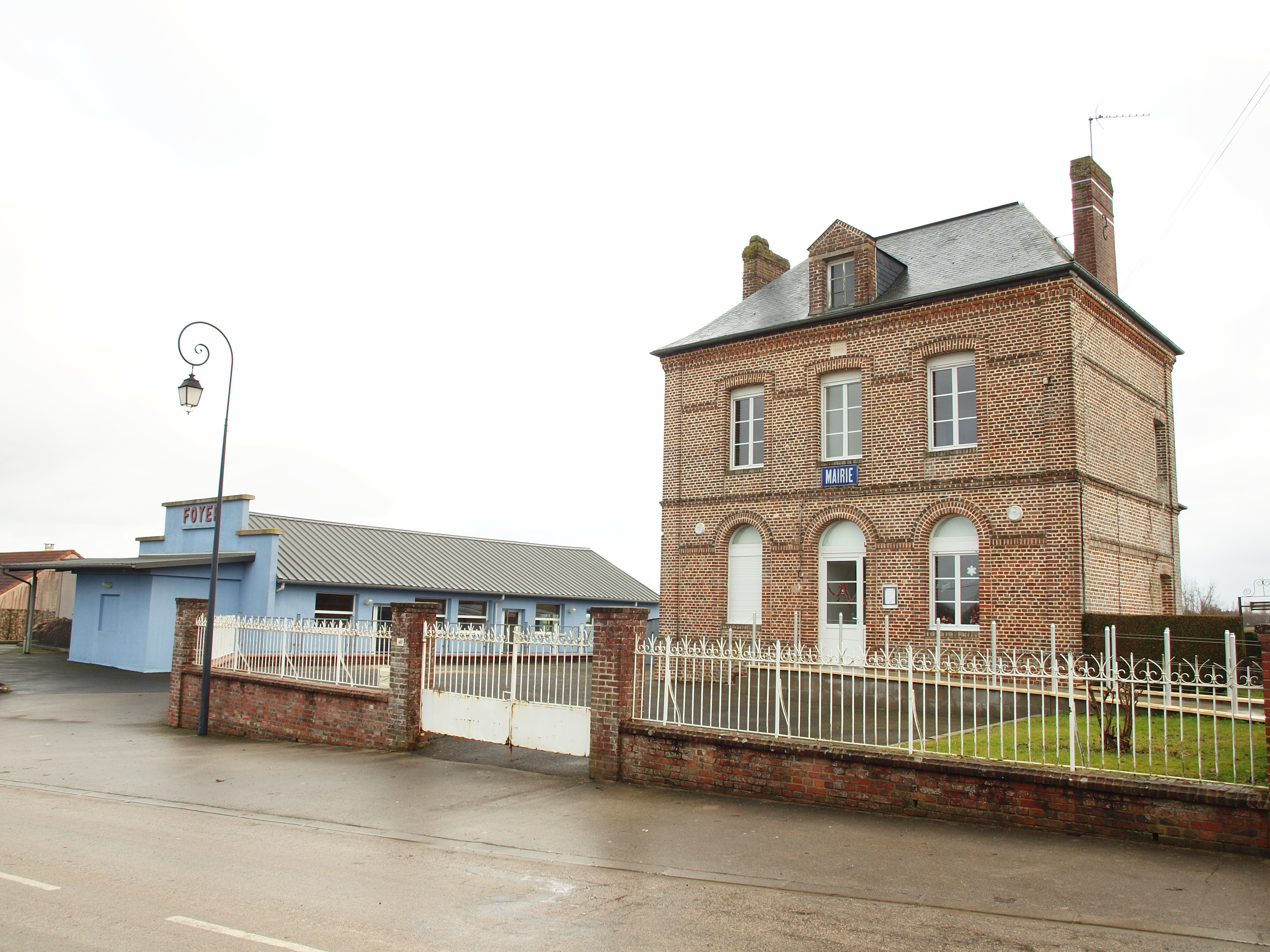
- The town hall in Roncherolles-en-Bray
- Location of Roncherolles-en-Bray
- Location within France Location within Normandy
- Coordinates: 49°37′00″N 1°28′05″E
- Country: France
- Region: Normandy
- Department: Seine-Maritime
- Arrondissement: Dieppe
- Canton: Gournay-en-Bray
- Intercommunality: CC 4 rivières

Government
  - Mayor (2020–2026): Michel Gibaux
- Area^{1}: 14.37 km^{2} (5.55 sq mi)
- Elevation: 161 m (528 ft)
- Highest elevation: 234 m (768 ft)
- Lowest elevation: 119 m (390 ft)
- Population (2023): 477
  - Density: 33.2/km^{2} (86.0/sq mi)
- Time zone: UTC+01:00 (CET)
  - Summer (DST): UTC+02:00 (CEST)
- INSEE/Postal code: 76535 /76440
- ^{1} French Land Register data, which excludes lakes, ponds, glaciers > 1 km^{2} (0.386 sq mi or 247 acres) and river estuaries.

Roncherolles-en-Bray (French pronunciation: [ʁɔ̃ʃʁɔl ɑ̃ bʁɛ], literally Roncherolles in Bray) is a commune in the Seine-Maritime department in the Normandy region in northern France.

== Geography ==
A forestry and farming village situated in the Pays de Bray at the junction of the D961, the D1, the D102 and the D24 roads, some 20 miles (32 km) northeast of Rouen. Cristal-Fontaine mineral water is bottled here.

== Population ==
Historical population
Year	Pop.	±% p.a.
1968	437	—
1975	426	−0.36%
1982	390	−1.25%
1990	414	+0.75%
1999	430	+0.42%
2007	439	+0.26%
2012	472	+1.46%
2017	479	+0.29%
2023	477	−0.07%
Source: INSEE

== Places of interest ==
- The sixteenth century church of St. Pierre & St. Paul.
- A chateau dating from the sixteenth century.

== See also ==
- Communes of the Seine-Maritime department
