= Fry, Seine-Maritime =

Fry
- Commune
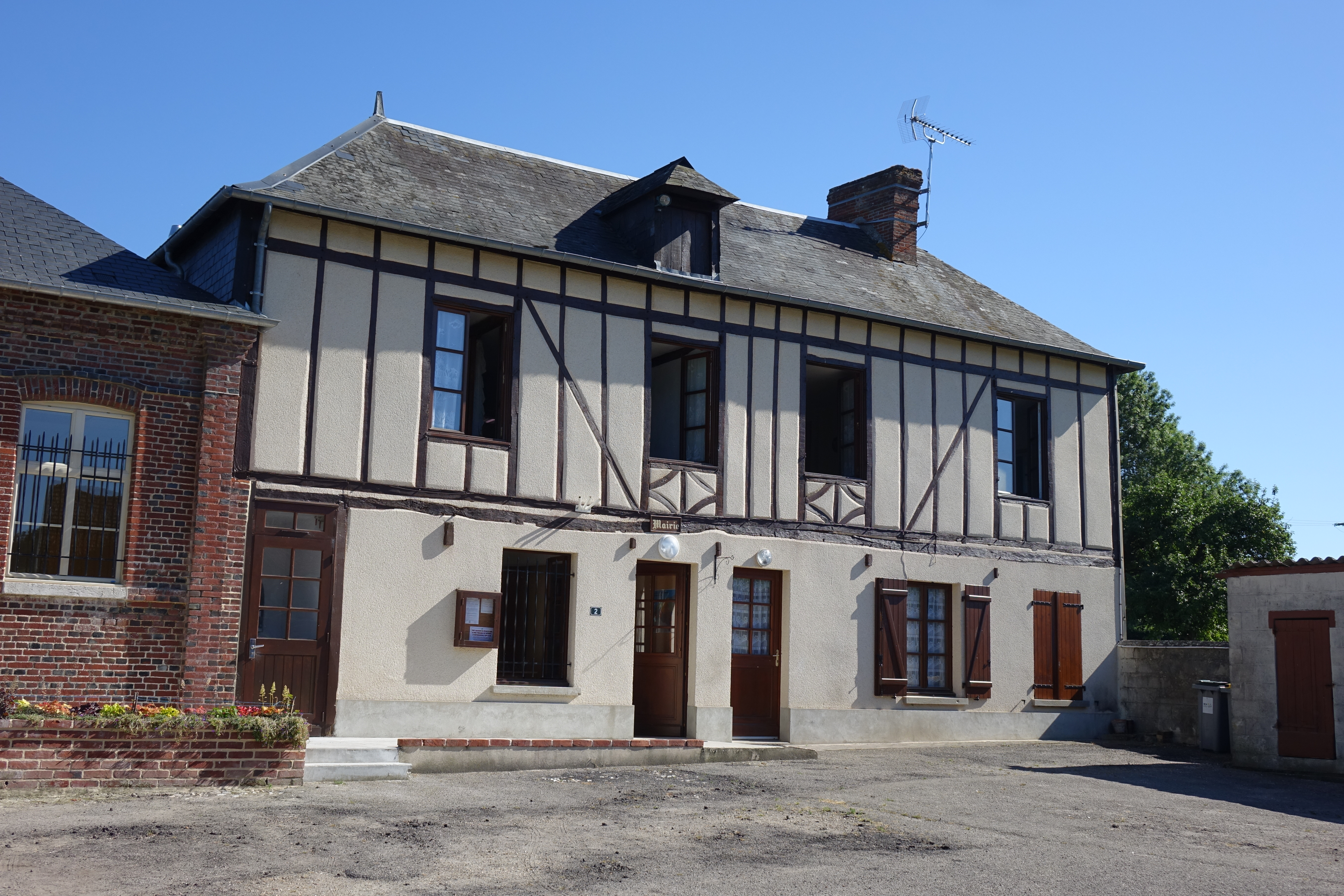
- The town hall in Fry
- Location of Fry
- Location within France Location within Normandy
- Coordinates: 49°31′50″N 1°31′40″E
- Country: France
- Region: Normandy
- Department: Seine-Maritime
- Arrondissement: Dieppe
- Canton: Gournay-en-Bray
- Intercommunality: CC 4 rivières

Government
  - Mayor (2026–32): Sylvie Aché
- Area^{1}: 8.03 km^{2} (3.10 sq mi)
- Elevation: 118 m (387 ft)
- Highest elevation: 216 m (709 ft)
- Lowest elevation: 108 m (354 ft)
- Population (2023): 139
  - Density: 17.3/km^{2} (44.8/sq mi)
- Time zone: UTC+01:00 (CET)
  - Summer (DST): UTC+02:00 (CEST)
- INSEE/Postal code: 76292 /76780
- ^{1} French Land Register data, which excludes lakes, ponds, glaciers > 1 km^{2} (0.386 sq mi or 247 acres) and river estuaries.

Fry (French pronunciation: [fʁi]) is a commune in the Seine-Maritime department in the Normandy region in northern France.

== Geography ==
A small farming village situated in the Pays de Bray, some 20 miles (32 km) northeast of Rouen, at the junction of the D1, D128 and the D921 roads.

== Population ==
Historical population
| Year | Pop. | ±% p.a. |
|---|---|---|
| 1968 | 167 | — |
| 1975 | 150 | −1.52% |
| 1982 | 123 | −2.80% |
| 1990 | 133 | +0.98% |
| 1999 | 136 | +0.25% |
| 2007 | 137 | +0.09% |
| 2012 | 161 | +3.28% |
| 2017 | 148 | −1.67% |
| 2023 | 139 | −1.04% |
Source: INSEE

== Places of interest ==
- The thirteenth century church of St.Martin.
- A presbytery dating from the seventeenth century.

== See also ==
- Communes of the Seine-Maritime department
