= Pommereux =

- Commune
- Location of Pommereux
- Location within France Location within Normandy
- Coordinates: 49°36′12″N 1°37′30″E
- Country: France
- Region: Normandy
- Department: Seine-Maritime
- Arrondissement: Dieppe
- Canton: Gournay-en-Bray
- Intercommunality: CC 4 rivières

Government
  - Mayor (2026–32): Annie Sence
- Area^{1}: 5.39 km^{2} (2.08 sq mi)
- Elevation: 150 m (490 ft)
- Highest elevation: 223 m (732 ft)
- Lowest elevation: 144 m (472 ft)
- Population (2023): 94
  - Density: 17/km^{2} (45/sq mi)
- Time zone: UTC+01:00 (CET)
  - Summer (DST): UTC+02:00 (CEST)
- INSEE/Postal code: 76505 /76440
- ^{1} French Land Register data, which excludes lakes, ponds, glaciers > 1 km^{2} (0.386 sq mi or 247 acres) and river estuaries.

Pommereux (French pronunciation: [pɔmʁø]) is a commune of the Seine-Maritime department in the Normandy region of northern France.

== Geography ==
This is a small farming village situated in the Eaulne valley in the Pays de Bray at the junction of the D156 and the D61 roads, some 35 miles (56 km) southeast of Dieppe.

== Population ==
Historical population
Year	Pop.	±% p.a.
1968	125	—
1975	102	−2.86%
1982	79	−3.58%
1990	81	+0.31%
1999	87	+0.80%
2007	100	+1.76%
2012	105	+0.98%
2017	96	−1.78%
2023	94	−0.35%
Source: INSEE

== See also ==
- Communes of the Seine-Maritime department
