= Compainville =

- Commune
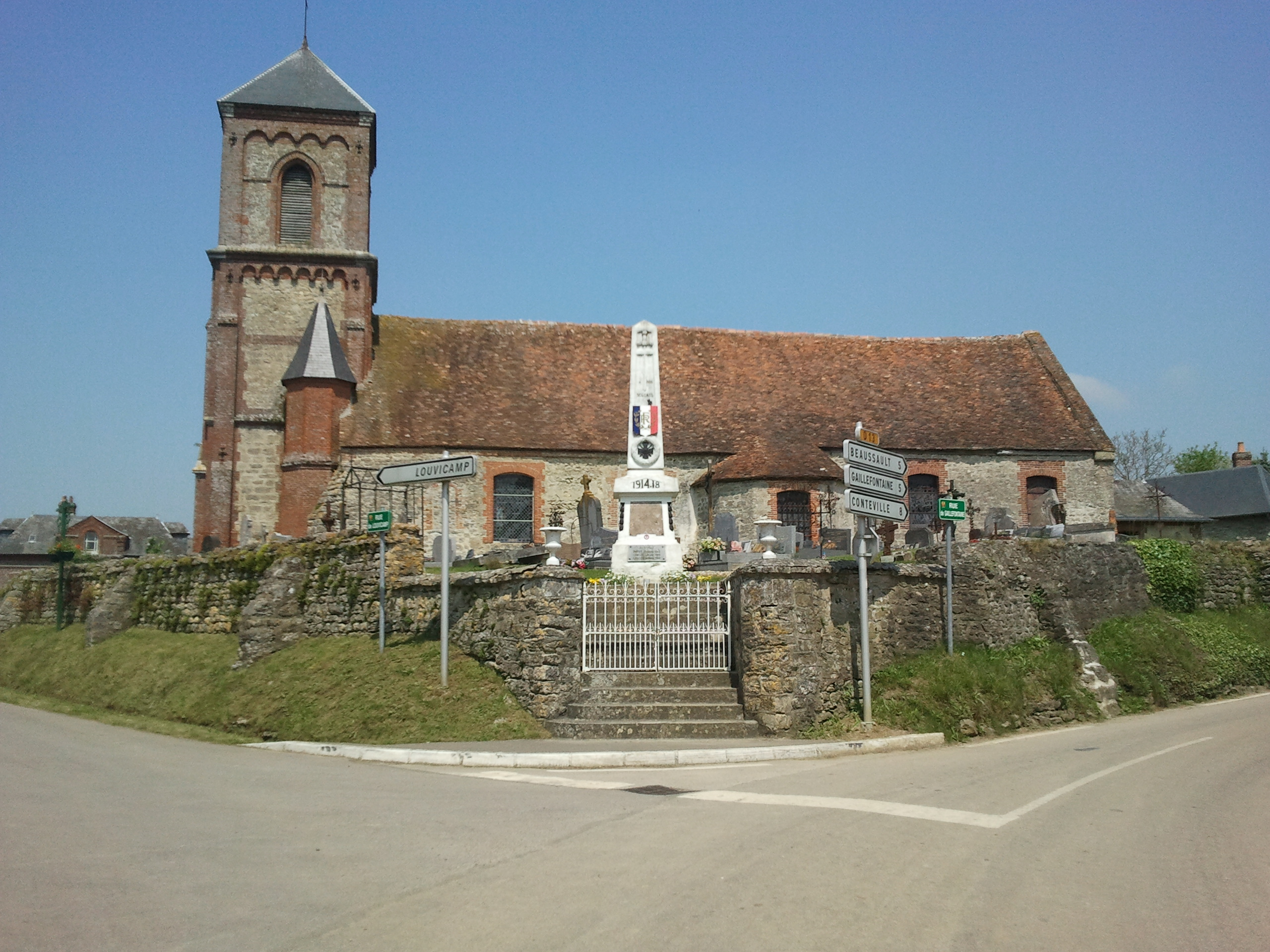
- The church in Compainville

- Coat of arms
- Location of Compainville
- Location within France Location within Normandy
- Coordinates: 49°39′46″N 1°33′37″E
- Country: France
- Region: Normandy
- Department: Seine-Maritime
- Arrondissement: Dieppe
- Canton: Gournay-en-Bray
- Intercommunality: CC 4 rivières

Government
  - Mayor (2020–2026): Bruno Nottias
- Area^{1}: 6.36 km^{2} (2.46 sq mi)
- Elevation: 200 m (660 ft)
- Highest elevation: 231 m (758 ft)
- Lowest elevation: 130 m (430 ft)
- Population (2023): 159
  - Density: 25.0/km^{2} (64.7/sq mi)
- Time zone: UTC+01:00 (CET)
  - Summer (DST): UTC+02:00 (CEST)
- INSEE/Postal code: 76185 /76440
- ^{1} French Land Register data, which excludes lakes, ponds, glaciers > 1 km^{2} (0.386 sq mi or 247 acres) and river estuaries.

Compainville (French pronunciation: [kɔ̃pɛ̃vil]) is a commune in the Seine-Maritime department in the Normandy region in north-western France.

== Geography ==
A small farming village situated by the banks of the river Béthune in the Pays de Bray, some 33 miles (53 km) south of Dieppe, at the junction of the D20 and the D13 roads.

== Population ==
Historical population
Year	Pop.	±% p.a.
1968	219	—
1975	136	−6.58%
1982	166	+2.89%
1990	141	−2.02%
1999	108	−2.92%
2007	130	+2.34%
2012	158	+3.98%
2017	180	+2.64%
2023	159	−2.05%
Source: INSEE

== Places of interest ==
- The church of St.Pierre & St.Marc, dating from the twelfth century.

== See also ==
- Communes of the Seine-Maritime department
