= La Hallotière =

- Commune
- Coat of arms
- Location of La Hallotière
- Location within France Location within Normandy
- Coordinates: 49°31′09″N 1°28′13″E
- Country: France
- Region: Normandy
- Department: Seine-Maritime
- Arrondissement: Dieppe
- Canton: Gournay-en-Bray
- Intercommunality: CC 4 rivières

Government
  - Mayor (2026–32): Sébastien Joly
- Area^{1}: 3.75 km^{2} (1.45 sq mi)
- Elevation: 200 m (660 ft)
- Highest elevation: 213 m (699 ft)
- Lowest elevation: 90 m (300 ft)
- Population (2023): 200
  - Density: 53/km^{2} (140/sq mi)
- Time zone: UTC+01:00 (CET)
  - Summer (DST): UTC+02:00 (CEST)
- INSEE/Postal code: 76338 /76780
- ^{1} French Land Register data, which excludes lakes, ponds, glaciers > 1 km^{2} (0.386 sq mi or 247 acres) and river estuaries.

La Hallotière (French pronunciation: [la alɔtjɛʁ]) is a commune in the Seine-Maritime department in the Normandy region in north-western France.

== Geography ==
A farming village situated by the banks of the Andelle river in the Pays de Bray, some 15 miles (24 km) northeast of Rouen near the junction of the D57 and the D921 roads.

== Population ==
Historical population
Year	Pop.	±% p.a.
1968	128	—
1975	122	−0.68%
1982	150	+3.00%
1990	158	+0.65%
1999	148	−0.72%
2007	129	−1.70%
2012	208	+10.03%
2017	221	+1.22%
2023	200	−1.65%
Source: INSEE

== Places of interest ==
- A restored windmill.
- The church of Notre-Dame, dating from the eighteenth century.

== See also ==
- Communes of the Seine-Maritime department
