= Haucourt, Seine-Maritime =

Haucourt
- Commune
- Location of Haucourt
- Location within France Location within Normandy
- Coordinates: 49°38′29″N 1°39′37″E
- Country: France
- Region: Normandy
- Department: Seine-Maritime
- Arrondissement: Dieppe
- Canton: Gournay-en-Bray
- Intercommunality: CC 4 rivières

Government
  - Mayor (2020–2026): Jean-Manuel Buquet
- Area^{1}: 10.18 km^{2} (3.93 sq mi)
- Elevation: 228 m (748 ft)
- Highest elevation: 246 m (807 ft)
- Lowest elevation: 188 m (617 ft)
- Population (2023): 194
  - Density: 19.1/km^{2} (49.4/sq mi)
- Time zone: UTC+01:00 (CET)
  - Summer (DST): UTC+02:00 (CEST)
- INSEE/Postal code: 76343 /76440
- ^{1} French Land Register data, which excludes lakes, ponds, glaciers > 1 km^{2} (0.386 sq mi or 247 acres) and river estuaries.

Haucourt (French pronunciation: [okuʁ]) is a commune in the Seine-Maritime department in the Normandy region in northern France.

== Geography ==
A farming village together with four hamlets, situated in the Pays de Bray, some 35 miles (56 km) southeast of Dieppe at the junction of the D129 and D919 roads.

== Population ==
Historical population
Year	Pop.	±% p.a.
1968	278	—
1975	224	−3.04%
1982	202	−1.47%
1990	209	+0.43%
1999	204	−0.27%
2007	236	+1.84%
2012	248	+1.00%
2017	207	−3.55%
2023	194	−1.08%
Source: INSEE

== Places of interest ==
- The sixteenth-century château.
- Vestiges of a priory at the hamlet of Pierrement.
- A former military headquarters building and thirteenth-century chapel at Villedieu
- The church of St. Leonard, dating from the twelfth century.

== See also ==
- Communes of the Seine-Maritime department
