= Grumesnil =

- Commune
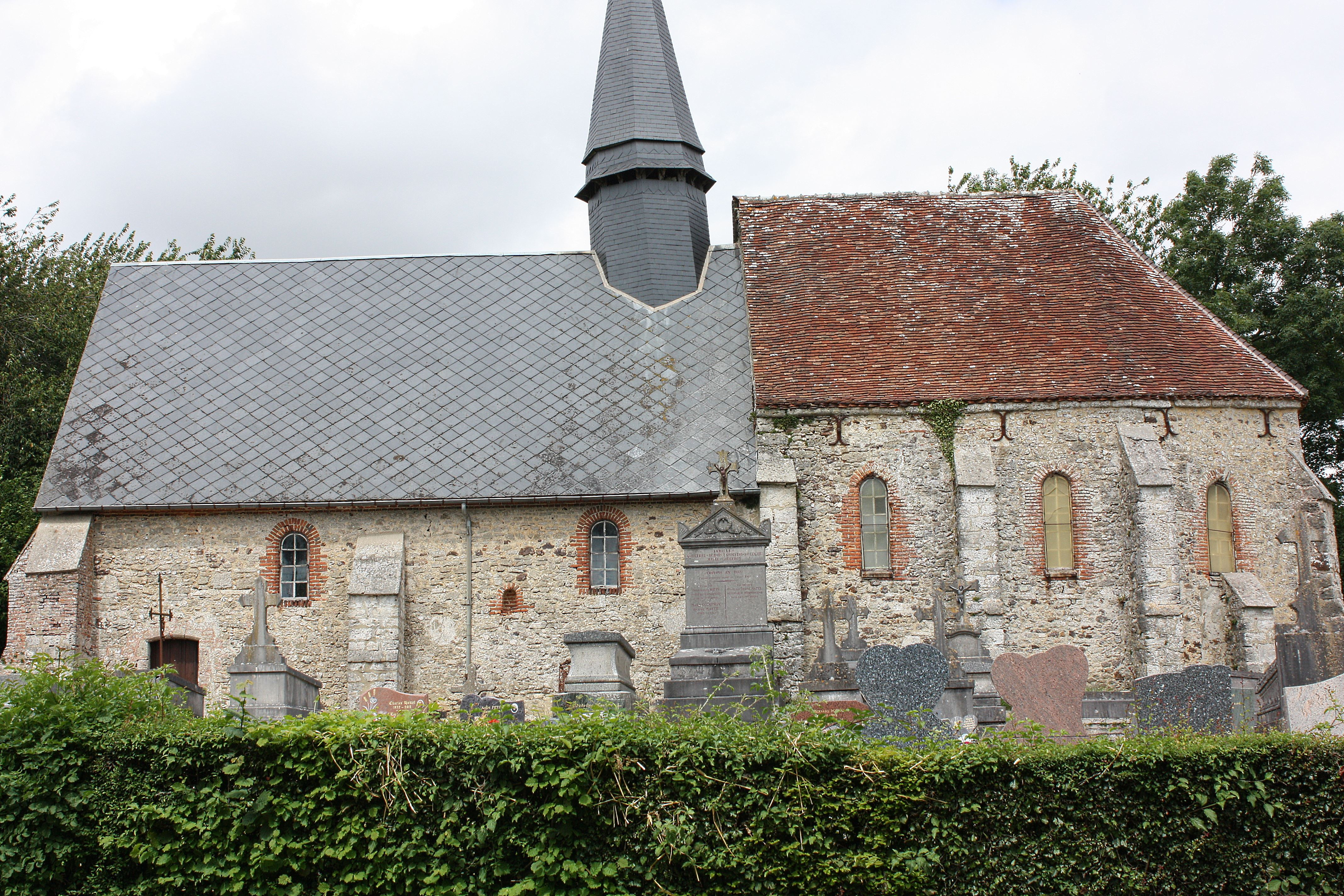
- The chapel of Saint-Pierre-mi-les-Camps
- Location of Grumesnil
- Location within France Location within Normandy
- Coordinates: 49°36′36″N 1°41′36″E
- Country: France
- Region: Normandy
- Department: Seine-Maritime
- Arrondissement: Dieppe
- Canton: Gournay-en-Bray
- Intercommunality: CC 4 rivières

Government
  - Mayor (2020–2026): Jacques Buquet
- Area^{1}: 11.16 km^{2} (4.31 sq mi)
- Elevation: 170 m (560 ft)
- Highest elevation: 229 m (751 ft)
- Lowest elevation: 167 m (548 ft)
- Population (2023): 485
  - Density: 43.5/km^{2} (113/sq mi)
- Time zone: UTC+01:00 (CET)
  - Summer (DST): UTC+02:00 (CEST)
- INSEE/Postal code: 76332 /76440
- ^{1} French Land Register data, which excludes lakes, ponds, glaciers > 1 km^{2} (0.386 sq mi or 247 acres) and river estuaries.

Grumesnil (French pronunciation: [ɡʁymenil]) is a commune in the Seine-Maritime department in the Normandy region in northern France.

== Geography ==
Grumesnil is a farming village situated in the Pays de Bray, some 40 miles (64 km) southeast of Dieppe at the junction of the D105 and the D8 roads. The commune borders the neighbouring département of Oise.

== Population ==
Historical population
Year	Pop.	±% p.a.
1968	367	—
1975	325	−1.72%
1982	333	+0.35%
1990	335	+0.07%
1999	403	+2.07%
2007	494	+2.58%
2012	462	−1.33%
2017	441	−0.93%
2023	485	+1.60%
Source: INSEE

== Places of interest ==
- The church of St. Pierre, dating from the thirteenth century.
- An eleventh-century chapel.
- The seventeenth-century chateau.

== See also ==
- Communes of the Seine-Maritime department
