= Beaussault =

- Commune
- Location of Beaussault
- Location within France Location within Normandy
- Coordinates: 49°41′09″N 1°33′49″E
- Country: France
- Region: Normandy
- Department: Seine-Maritime
- Arrondissement: Dieppe
- Canton: Gournay-en-Bray
- Intercommunality: CC 4 rivières

Government
  - Mayor (2026–32): Laurent Fournier
- Area^{1}: 18.3 km^{2} (7.1 sq mi)
- Elevation: 127 m (417 ft)
- Highest elevation: 242 m (794 ft)
- Lowest elevation: 112 m (367 ft)
- Population (2023): 410
  - Density: 22/km^{2} (58/sq mi)
- Time zone: UTC+01:00 (CET)
  - Summer (DST): UTC+02:00 (CEST)
- INSEE/Postal code: 76065 /76870
- ^{1} French Land Register data, which excludes lakes, ponds, glaciers > 1 km^{2} (0.386 sq mi or 247 acres) and river estuaries.

Beaussault is a commune in the Seine-Maritime department in the Normandy region in northern France.

== Geography ==
A farming village in the Pays de Bray, situated by the banks of the river Béthune, some 26 miles (42 km) southeast of Dieppe, at the junction of the D35, D135 and D102 roads.

== Population ==
Historical population
| Year | Pop. | ±% p.a. |
|---|---|---|
| 1968 | 581 | — |
| 1975 | 511 | −1.82% |
| 1982 | 408 | −3.16% |
| 1990 | 367 | −1.32% |
| 1999 | 369 | +0.06% |
| 2007 | 383 | +0.47% |
| 2012 | 406 | +1.17% |
| 2017 | 411 | +0.25% |
| 2023 | 410 | −0.04% |
Source: INSEE

== Places of interest ==
- Traces of a priory.
- The ruins of a castle, dating from the thirteenth century.
- The church of St. Germain, dating from the twelfth century.
- The chapel of St.Jean-Baptiste, dating from the eleventh century.

== See also ==
- Communes of the Seine-Maritime department
