= La Feuillie, Seine-Maritime =

La Feuillie
- Commune
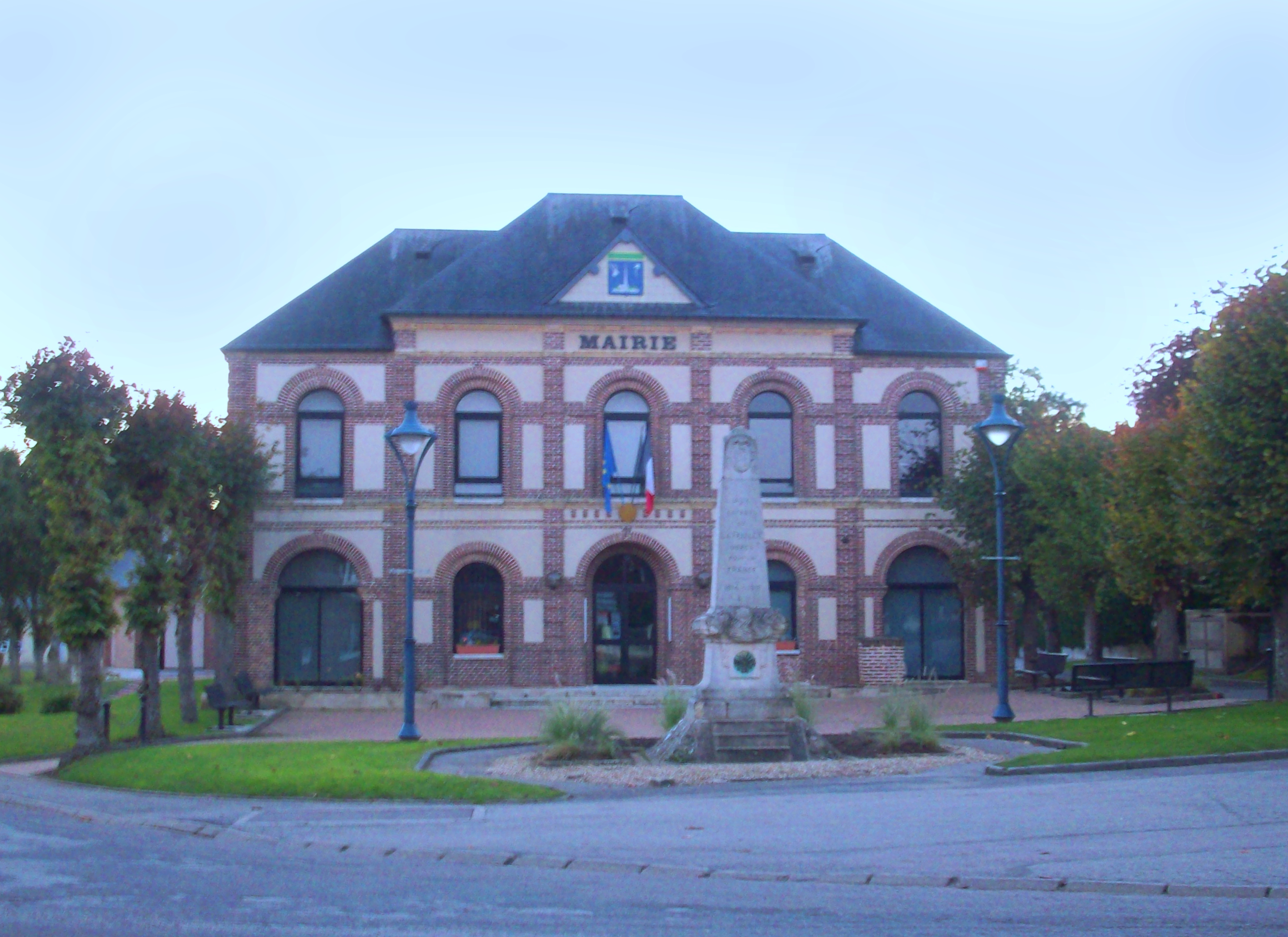
- The town hall in La Feuillie

- Coat of arms
- Location of La Feuillie
- Location within France Location within Normandy
- Coordinates: 49°27′47″N 1°30′53″E
- Country: France
- Region: Normandy
- Department: Seine-Maritime
- Arrondissement: Dieppe
- Canton: Gournay-en-Bray
- Intercommunality: CC 4 rivières

Government
  - Mayor (2026–32): Pascal Legay
- Area^{1}: 139.76 km^{2} (53.96 sq mi)
- Elevation: 175 m (574 ft)
- Highest elevation: 219 m (719 ft)
- Lowest elevation: 90 m (300 ft)
- Population (2023): 1,228
  - Density: 8.786/km^{2} (22.76/sq mi)
- Time zone: UTC+01:00 (CET)
  - Summer (DST): UTC+02:00 (CEST)
- INSEE/Postal code: 76263 /76220
- ^{1} French Land Register data, which excludes lakes, ponds, glaciers > 1 km^{2} (0.386 sq mi or 247 acres) and river estuaries.

La Feuillie is a commune in the Seine-Maritime department in the Normandy region in north-western France.

== Geography ==
A forestry and farming village situated in the Pays de Bray, some 21 miles (34 km) east of Rouen at the junction of the N 31, the D 62, 84, 128 and 921 (former N 321) roads.

== Population ==
Historical population
| Year | Pop. | ±% p.a. |
|---|---|---|
| 1968 | 1,021 | — |
| 1975 | 1,022 | +0.01% |
| 1982 | 1,030 | +0.11% |
| 1990 | 1,008 | −0.27% |
| 1999 | 1,096 | +0.93% |
| 2007 | 1,207 | +1.21% |
| 2012 | 1,275 | +1.10% |
| 2017 | 1,296 | +0.33% |
| 2023 | 1,228 | −0.89% |
Source: INSEE

== Places of interest ==
- The ruins of a feudal castle.
- The church of St. Eustache, dating from the sixteenth century.

== See also ==
- Communes of the Seine-Maritime department
