= Canton of Gournay-en-Bray =

Coordinates: 49°29′35″N 1°40′53″E

Gournay-en-Bray
- Canton
- Country: France
- Region: Normandy
- Department: Seine-Maritime
- No. of communes: {{{nbcomm}}}
- Area: 788.76 km^{2} (304.54 sq mi)
- Population (2023): 35,181
  - Density: 44.603/km^{2} (115.52/sq mi)
- INSEE code: 76 12

The Canton of Gournay-en-Bray is a canton situated in the Seine-Maritime département and in the Normandy region of northern France.

== Geography ==
An area of farming and associated light industry, centred on the town of Gournay-en-Bray.

== Composition ==
At the French canton reorganisation which came into effect in March 2015, the canton was expanded from 16 to 68 communes (4 of which merged into the communes of Forges-les-Eaux and Morville-le-Héron):

1. Argueil
2. Aubéguimont
3. Aumale
4. Avesnes-en-Bray
5. Beaubec-la-Rosière
6. Beaussault
7. Beauvoir-en-Lyons
8. La Bellière
9. Bézancourt
10. Bosc-Hyons
11. Brémontier-Merval
12. Le Caule-Sainte-Beuve
13. La Chapelle-Saint-Ouen
14. Compainville
15. Conteville
16. Criquiers
17. Croisy-sur-Andelle
18. Cuy-Saint-Fiacre
19. Dampierre-en-Bray
20. Doudeauville
21. Elbeuf-en-Bray
22. Ellecourt
23. Ernemont-la-Villette
24. Ferrières-en-Bray
25. La Ferté-Saint-Samson
26. La Feuillie
27. Forges-les-Eaux
28. Fry
29. Gaillefontaine
30. Gancourt-Saint-Étienne
31. Gournay-en-Bray
32. Grumesnil
33. La Hallotière
34. Haucourt
35. Haudricourt
36. Haussez
37. La Haye
38. Hodeng-Hodenger
39. Illois
40. Landes-Vieilles-et-Neuves
41. Longmesnil
42. Marques
43. Mauquenchy
44. Ménerval
45. Mésangueville
46. Le Mesnil-Lieubray
47. Mesnil-Mauger
48. Molagnies
49. Montroty
50. Morienne
51. Morville-le-Héron
52. Neuf-Marché
53. Nolléval
54. Nullemont
55. Pommereux
56. Richemont
57. Roncherolles-en-Bray
58. Ronchois
59. Rouvray-Catillon
60. Saint-Lucien
61. Saint-Michel-d'Halescourt
62. Saumont-la-Poterie
63. Serqueux
64. Sigy-en-Bray
65. Le Thil-Riberpré
66. Vieux-Rouen-sur-Bresle

== Population ==
Historical population
Year	Pop.	±% p.a.
2013	36,980	—
2018	35,967	−0.55%
Source: INSEE

== See also ==
- Arrondissements of the Seine-Maritime department
- Cantons of the Seine-Maritime department
- Communes of the Seine-Maritime department
