= Epte =

River in Normandy, France

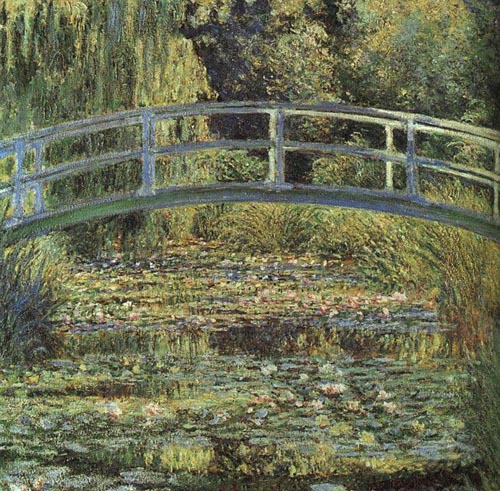
- Claude Monet's 1899 The Waterlily Pond, green harmony. Monet's Water Lilies series was created and inspired by diverting a branch of the Epte to a section of his gardens.

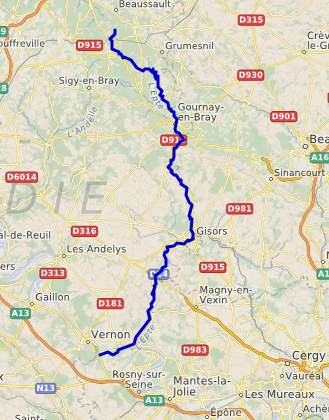

Location
- Country: France

Physical characteristics
- Source
  - location: Normandy
  - elevation: 190 m (620 ft)
- Mouth
  - location: Seine
  - coordinates: 49°3′40″N 1°31′42″E
- Length: 112.5 km (69.9 mi)
- Basin size: 1,403 km^{2} (542 sq mi)
- Discharge
  - average: 9.8 m^{3}/s (350 cu ft/s)

Basin features
- Progression: Seine→ English Channel

The Epte (French pronunciation: [ɛpt]) is a river in Seine-Maritime and Eure, in Normandy, France. It is a right tributary of the Seine, 112.5 km (69.9 mi) long. The river rises in Seine-Maritime in the Pays de Bray, near Forges-les-Eaux, and empties into the Seine not far from Giverny. One of its tributaries is the Aubette de Magny. In 911, the Treaty of Saint-Clair-sur-Epte established the river as the historical boundary of Normandy and Île-de-France.

Claude Monet lived at Giverny near the river for more than forty years. In his garden, by diverting a branch of the Epte, he established a water garden with a water-lily pond and Japanese-style bridge. The river appears in a number of his works, including Peupliers au bord de l'Epte.
