= Communauté de communes de Blangy-sur-Bresle =

Coordinates: 49.9311°N 1.6318°E

Blangy-sur-Bresle
- Former communauté de communes
- Interactive map of Blangy-sur-Bresle
- Country: France
- Region: Hauts-de-France, Normandy
- Department: Seine-Maritime, Somme
- No. of communes: {{{nbcomm}}}
- Established: 2001
- Disbanded: 2017
- Area: 274.0 km^{2} (105.8 sq mi)
- Population (2013): 15,016
  - Density: 54.80/km^{2} (141.9/sq mi)

The Communauté de communes de Blangy-sur-Bresle is a former communauté de communes in the Seine-Maritime département (in the Normandy région) and also in the Somme département (Hauts-de-France région) of France. It was created in December 2001. On 18 January 2007, 5 communes of the Somme, (Bouillancourt-en-Séry, Bouttencourt, Maisnières, Tilloy-Floriville and Vismes) joined the Communauté. They were followed by 4 more communes from Somme in 2009. It was merged into the new Communauté de communes interrégionale Aumale - Blangy-sur-Bresle in January 2017.

== Composition ==
This Communauté de communes comprised 19 communes in Seine-Maritime and 9 communes in Somme:

- Aubermesnil-aux-Érables
- Bazinval
- Biencourt
- Blangy-sur-Bresle
- Bouillancourt-en-Séry
- Bouttencourt
- Campneuseville
- Dancourt
- Fallencourt
- Foucarmont
- Frettemeule
- Guerville
- Hodeng-au-Bosc
- Maisnières
- Martainneville
- Monchaux-Soreng
- Nesle-Normandeuse
- Pierrecourt
- Ramburelles
- Réalcamp
- Rétonval
- Rieux
- Saint-Léger-aux-Bois
- Saint-Martin-au-Bosc
- Saint-Riquier-en-Rivière
- Tilloy-Floriville
- Villers-sous-Foucarmont
- Vismes

== See also ==
- Communes of the Seine-Maritime department
- Communes of the Somme department
