= Canton of Blangy-sur-Bresle =

Coordinates: 49°53′18″N 1°36′08″E

Blangy-sur-Bresle
- Former canton
- Interactive map of Blangy-sur-Bresle
- Country: France
- Region: Normandy
- Department: Seine-Maritime
- No. of communes: {{{nbcomm}}}
- Disbanded: 2015
- Area: 192.23 km^{2} (74.22 sq mi)
- Population (2012): 10,681
  - Density: 55.564/km^{2} (143.91/sq mi)

The Canton of Blangy-sur-Bresle is a former canton situated in the Seine-Maritime département and in the Haute-Normandie region of northern France. It was disbanded following the French canton reorganisation which came into effect in March 2015. It consisted of 19 communes, which joined the canton of Eu in 2015. It had a total of 10,681 inhabitants (2012).

== Geography ==
An area of farming, forestry and light industry (especially glassmaking) in the arrondissement of Dieppe, centred on the town of Blangy-sur-Bresle. The altitude varies from 27m (Monchaux-Soreng) to 223m (Villers-sous-Foucarmont) with an average altitude of 122m.

The canton comprised 19 communes:

- Aubermesnil-aux-Érables
- Bazinval
- Blangy-sur-Bresle
- Campneuseville
- Dancourt
- Fallencourt
- Foucarmont
- Guerville
- Hodeng-au-Bosc
- Monchaux-Soreng
- Nesle-Normandeuse
- Pierrecourt
- Réalcamp
- Rétonval
- Rieux
- Saint-Léger-aux-Bois
- Saint-Martin-au-Bosc
- Saint-Riquier-en-Rivière
- Villers-sous-Foucarmont

== Population ==
Historical population Canton of Blangy-sur-Bresle
Year	1962	1968	1975	1982	1990	1999
Pop.	9,936	10,844	10,844	10,929	10,826	10,859
±%	—	+9.1%	+0.0%	+0.8%	−0.9%	+0.3%
From the year 1962 on: No double counting – residents of multiple communes (e.g. students and military personnel) are counted only once. Source: INSEE

== See also ==
- Arrondissements of the Seine-Maritime department
- Cantons of the Seine-Maritime department
- Communes of the Seine-Maritime department
