= Monchy =

Monchy may refer to:

== Places ==
- Monchy, Saint Lucia, a town in Saint Lucia
- Monchy, Saskatchewan, a former settlement in Saskatchewan, Canada

=== France ===
- Monchy-au-Bois, a commune in the Pas-de-Calais department
- Monchy-Breton, a commune in the Pas-de-Calais department
- Monchy-Cayeux, a commune in the Pas-de-Calais department
- Monchy-Humières, a commune in the Oise department
- Monchy-Lagache, a commune in the Somme department
- Monchy-le-Preux, a commune in the Pas-de-Calais department
- Monchy-le-Preux (hamlet), a hamlet in the Seine-Maritime department
- Monchy-Saint-Éloi, a commune in the Oise department
- Monchy-sur-Eu, a commune in the Seine-Maritime department

== Other uses ==
- Monchy & Alexandra, a Dominican bachata musical group, active 1998–2008
