= Eu Forest =

Forest in France

Eu Forest French: Forêt d'Eu
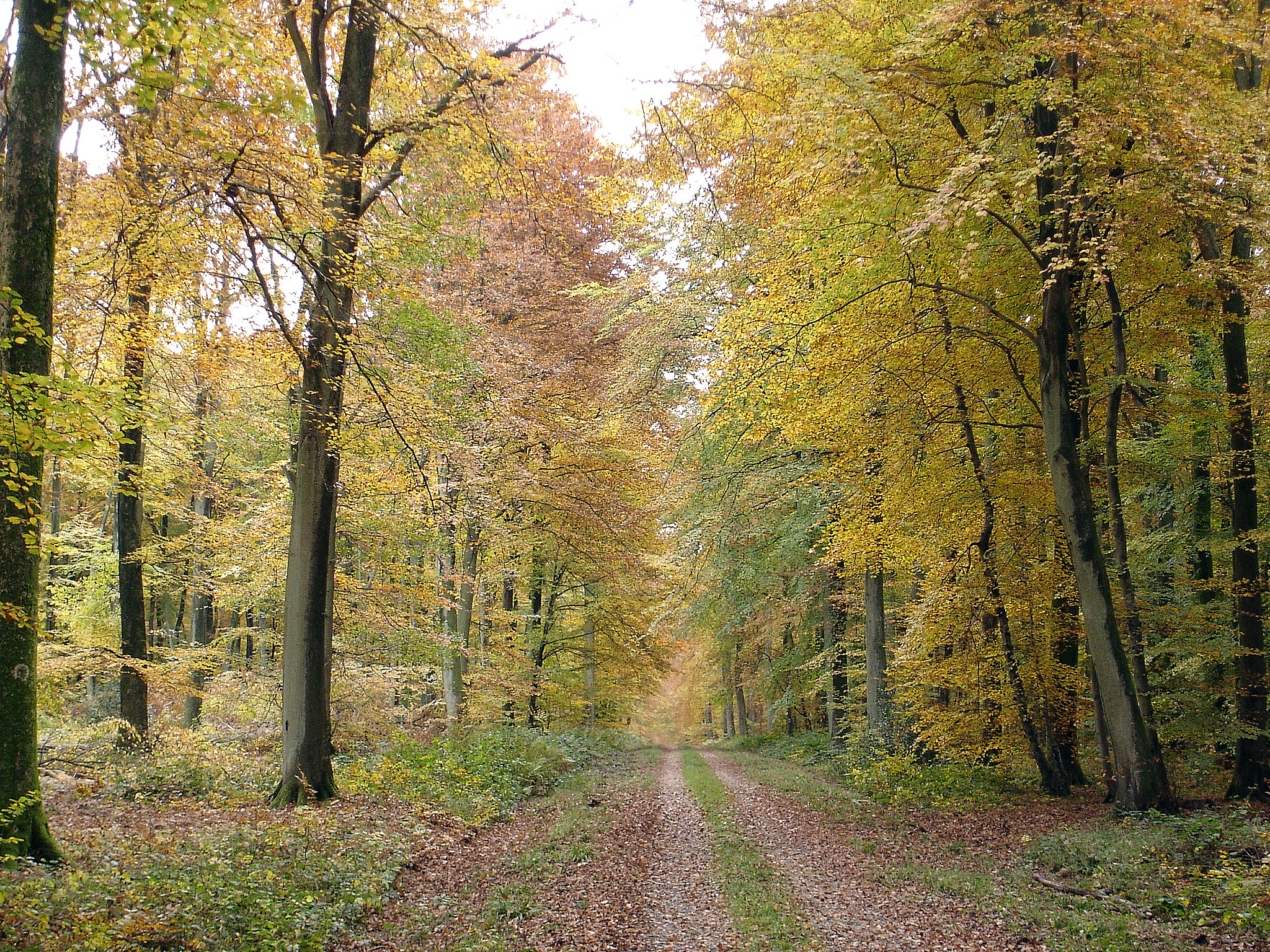
- Upper Eu Forest - route de Soreng

- Location within France
- Interactive map of Eu Forest

Geography
- Location: Seine-Maritime, Normandy, France
- Coordinates: 50°01′38″N 01°27′33″E
- Elevation: 45–215 metres
- Area: 9,300 hectares (23,000 acres)

Administration
- Authority: National Forests Office (France)

Ecology
- Forest cover: beech
- Dominant tree species: Fagus sylvatica L.

The Eu forest (French: Forêt d'Eu) is one of the great forests of Seine-Maritime, in Normandy. Covering an area of 9,300 hectares (23,000 acres), this beech forest, located in Le Petit Caux in the north-east of the department and the region, has close historical links to the Orléans family.

== Description ==
A narrow band more than 30 km long and 5 to 6 km wide, the Eu Forest covers the easternmost part of the chalk plateau that separates the Yères and Bresle rivers to the south-east of the town of Eu. This area extends from Saint-Pierre-en-Val, near Eu to the surroundings of Aumale and Mortemer.

The Eu forest is made up of several distinct zones. Immediately to the south-east of Eu is the Triage d'Eu (1,600 hectares (4,000 acres)), a slender-looking forest covering a small ridge bordering the Bresle Valley and the slopes of the dry Incheville valley. Further south, the Upper Eu Forest (3,500 hectares (8,600 acres)), is more massive, covering a tabular ridge of about 200m altitude. In the vicinity of Aumale, the Lower Eu Forest (2,800 hectares (6,900 acres)) occupies the southern end of the plateau, which is more tabular in appearance. These three massifs are separated by relatively large cultivated spaces, formerly wooded. Nearby isolated woodlands may also be included (adding a further total surface of 1,400 hectares (3,500 acres)): the woods of Tôt, Gomard, Cuverville, Saint-Martin-le-Gaillard along the Yères, and the wood of Guimerville from the Grand-Marché to the south-east of Blangy-sur-Bresle.

It is a naturally deciduous forest, but conifers were planted in the "voids" of the forest from 1900 to 1912, before this policy was extended to other Normandy forests (generally maintaining at least 90% hardwood). The National Forest Fund then further encouraged the re - encroachment of the coppice areas under single forest and coppice of private forests (throughout France ).

One of the curiosities of the forest of Eu has long been the Quesne à Leu (or wolves' oak), 27 meters high and planted in the seventeenth century; still living despite having fallen.

== Natural heritage ==
The Eu forest and the adjacent grasslands are a 'Natura 2000' site.

The Upper Eu forest and Yères and Bresle valleys are in a Natural zone of ecological interest, fauna and flora (French: Zone naturelle d'intérêt écologique, faunistique et floristique or ZNIEFF).

The Lower Eu forest is also in a Natural zone of ecological interest, fauna and flora.

== History and exploitation ==
The history of this forest begins with the abandonment, in the third century, of the Gallo-Roman city, 'Briga', built on the Beaumont plateau at a place called Bois l'Abbé, current excavations showing that this city was not surrounded by forested areas.

In 1036, Robert, Count of Eu, granted the monks of the Abbey of Saint-Michel du Tréport the tithe of pannage of the forest of Eu and all the sartage of this same forest. By a charter of August 1282, Jean 1st of Brienne, Count of Eu, undoubtedly at the instigation of his viscounts, limited the monks' pannage in the forest of Eu to eight free-range pigs, while maintaining free pasture for all their animals in the forest.

It seems that the forest covered, until the year 1000, the whole plateau separating the valleys of Yères and Bresle; large clearances were then undertaken from the 11th century to the 13th century. It was the time of initial fragmentation of the forest by cultivated fields which still divide the current forest of Eu into three massifs. Land clearing slowed in the 14th century with the start of the Hundred Years' War, the invasions of the troops of the King of England put an end to the prosperity of Normandy. This reduction of clearance continued despite the return to peace due to the development of regular logging. The Counts of Eu, landowners, found it more advantageous to sell the trees to charcoal burners, woodworkers and glassmakers than to cultivate low-paying lands.

The exploitation of the forest contributed to the establishment of many glass factories in the surroundings, in particular in the Bresle valley.

After belonging to the Dukes of Normandy, then to the Counts of Eu, the forest was confiscated during the French Revolution but it was returned to its former owner in 1814: Louise Marie Adélaïde de Bourbon, widow of Philippe Égalité and mother of Louis Philippe I, future king of France. The forest remained a possession of the Orleans family for a long time. In 1852, the forest became nationalised before being returned, once again, to its former owners, in 1872.

It was after this restitution that the 28 cast iron posts were installed across the forest, to mark the intersections of the paths. The best known of them is the Pole Maître Jean.

At the beginning of the 20th century, the forest passed into the hands of a civil society founded by friends of the Duke of Orleans to avoid state control. Finally, after the failure of an amicable acquisition by the authorities, the expropriation was decided by the law of August 13, 1913, allocating 90% to the state and 10% to the department of Seine-Inférieur (modern Seine-Maritime) on August 15, 1915.

== Bibliography ==
- Deck, Suzanne (1929). Study on the Forest of Eu. 2 (in French). Vol. 1. Caen: Jouan & Bigot.XI-205 pp., 4 cards
- La Forêt d'Eu (in French). Eu: Imprimerie de l'Informateur. 1972.
- Gracia, Alain (2002). La Forêt d'Eu (in French). Fécamp: Éditions des falaises. ISBN 978-2-84811-002-8.
