= Villy-sur-Yères =

- Commune
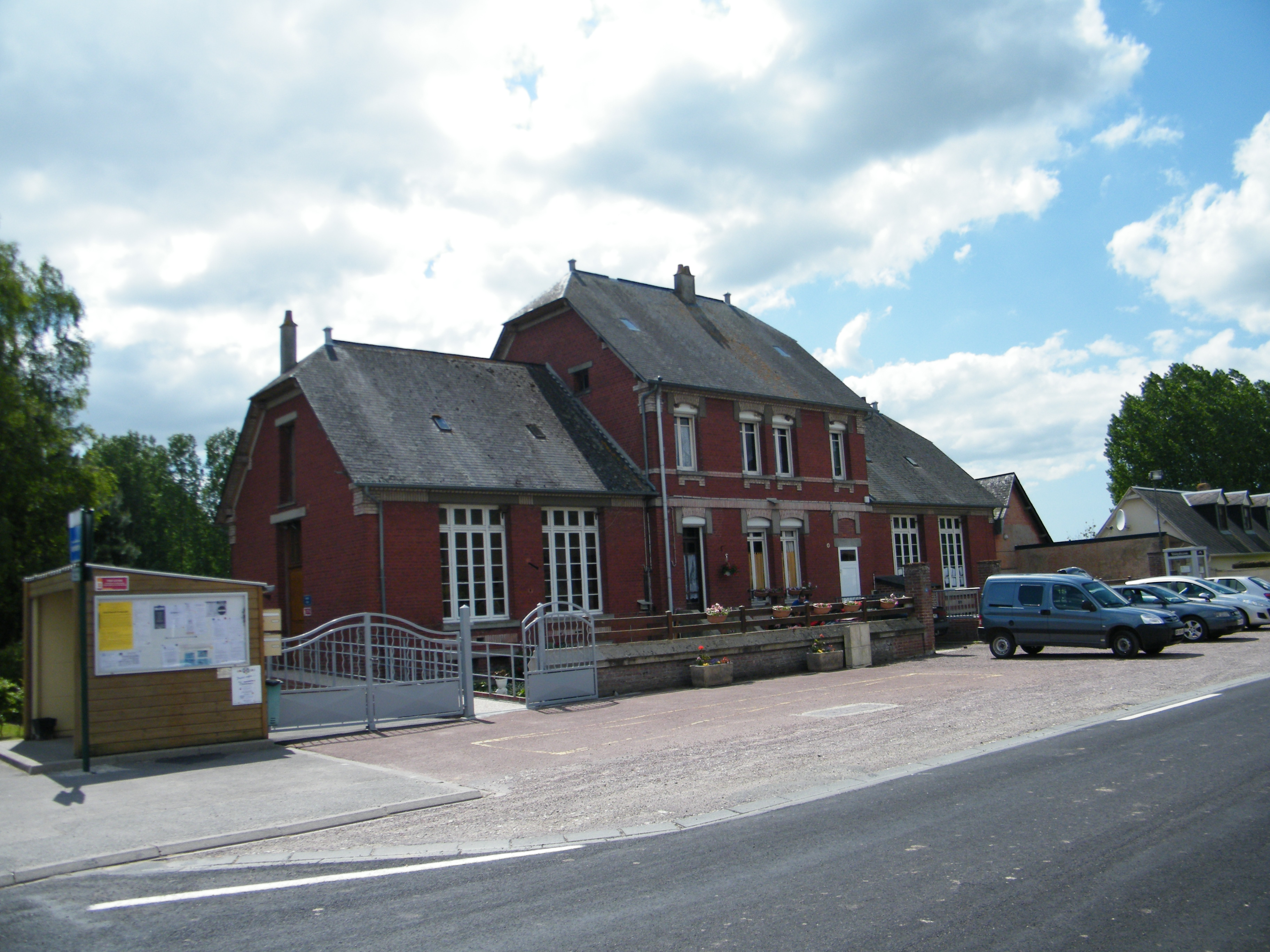
- The town hall in Villy-sur-Yères
- Location of Villy-sur-Yères
- Location within France Location within Normandy
- Coordinates: 49°56′36″N 1°27′04″E
- Country: France
- Region: Normandy
- Department: Seine-Maritime
- Arrondissement: Dieppe
- Canton: Eu
- Intercommunality: CC Falaises du Talou

Government
  - Mayor (2026–32): Christiane Hallier
- Area^{1}: 8.34 km^{2} (3.22 sq mi)
- Elevation: 20 m (66 ft)
- Population (2023): 224
  - Density: 26.9/km^{2} (69.6/sq mi)
- Time zone: UTC+01:00 (CET)
  - Summer (DST): UTC+02:00 (CEST)
- INSEE/Postal code: 76745 /76260
- ^{1} French Land Register data, which excludes lakes, ponds, glaciers > 1 km^{2} (0.386 sq mi or 247 acres) and river estuaries.

Villy-sur-Yères is a commune in the Seine-Maritime department in the Normandy region in northern France.

== Geography ==
A farming village situated on the banks of the Yères river in the Pays de Bray, some 18 miles (29 km) east of Dieppe at the junction of the D16 and the D315 roads. The village name was changed from Villy-le-Bas in 1998.

== Population ==
Historical population
Year	Pop.	±% p.a.
1968	200	—
1975	184	−1.18%
1982	180	−0.31%
1990	174	−0.42%
1999	138	−2.54%
2007	182	+3.52%
2012	205	+2.41%
2017	194	−1.10%
2023	224	+2.43%
Source: INSEE

== Places of interest ==
- The church of St. Martin, dating from the twelfth century.
- The church of St. Aqualin, dating from the sixteenth century.
- Ruins of an old priory in the middle of a field.

== See also ==
- Communes of the Seine-Maritime department
