= Communauté de communes interrégionale Aumale - Blangy-sur-Bresle =

Federation of municipalities in France

Interrégionale Aumale - Blangy-sur-Bresle
- Communauté de communes
- Interactive map of Interrégionale Aumale - Blangy-sur-Bresle
- Coordinates: 49°56′N 01°38′E
- Country: France
- Region: Hauts-de-France, Normandy
- Department: Seine-Maritime, Somme
- No. of communes: {{{nbcomm}}}
- Established: 2017
- Area: 464.3 km^{2} (179.3 sq mi)
- Population (2019): 21,417
  - Density: 46.13/km^{2} (119.5/sq mi)

The Communauté de communes interrégionale Aumale - Blangy-sur-Bresle is a communauté de communes in the Seine-Maritime and Somme départements and in the Normandy and Hauts-de-France régions of France. It was formed on 1 January 2017 by the merger of the former Communauté de communes du Canton d'Aumale and the Communauté de communes de Blangy-sur-Bresle. It consists of 44 communes (of which 10 in Somme), and its seat is in Blangy-sur-Bresle. Its area is 464.3 km^{2}, and its population was 21,417 in 2019.

== Composition ==
The communauté de communes consists of the following 44 communes:

1. Aubéguimont
2. Aubermesnil-aux-Érables
3. Aumale
4. Bazinval
5. Biencourt
6. Blangy-sur-Bresle
7. Bouillancourt-en-Séry
8. Bouttencourt
9. Campneuseville
10. Le Caule-Sainte-Beuve
11. Conteville
12. Criquiers
13. Dancourt
14. Ellecourt
15. Fallencourt
16. Foucarmont
17. Frettemeule
18. Guerville
19. Haudricourt
20. Hodeng-au-Bosc
21. Illois
22. Landes-Vieilles-et-Neuves
23. Maisnières
24. Marques
25. Martainneville
26. Monchaux-Soreng
27. Morienne
28. Nesle-Normandeuse
29. Nullemont
30. Pierrecourt
31. Ramburelles
32. Réalcamp
33. Rétonval
34. Richemont
35. Rieux
36. Ronchois
37. Saint-Léger-aux-Bois
38. Saint-Maxent
39. Saint-Martin-au-Bosc
40. Saint-Riquier-en-Rivière
41. Tilloy-Floriville
42. Vieux-Rouen-sur-Bresle
43. Villers-sous-Foucarmont
44. Vismes
