= Tilloy-Floriville =

- Commune
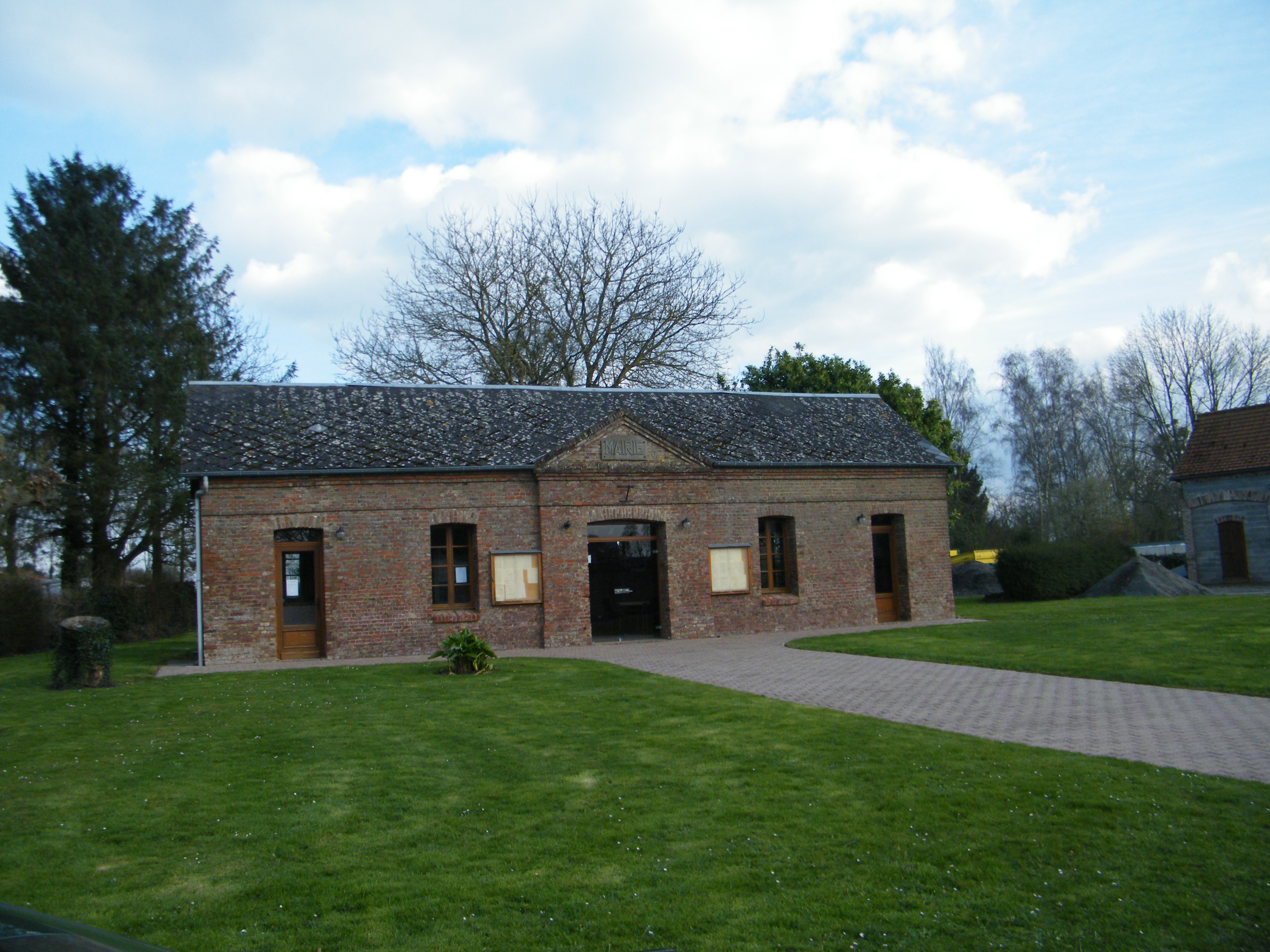
- The town hall in Tilloy-Floriville
- Location of Tilloy-Floriville
- Location within France Location within Hauts-de-France
- Coordinates: 49°59′19″N 1°36′40″E
- Country: France
- Region: Hauts-de-France
- Department: Somme
- Arrondissement: Abbeville
- Canton: Gamaches
- Intercommunality: CC Aumale - Blangy-sur-Bresle

Government
  - Mayor (2020–2026): Denis Dupont
- Area^{1}: 8.09 km^{2} (3.12 sq mi)
- Elevation: 37 m (121 ft)
- Highest elevation: 127 m (417 ft)
- Lowest elevation: 33 m (108 ft)
- Population (2023): 353
  - Density: 43.6/km^{2} (113/sq mi)
- Time zone: UTC+01:00 (CET)
  - Summer (DST): UTC+02:00 (CEST)
- INSEE/Postal code: 80760 /80220
- ^{1} French Land Register data, which excludes lakes, ponds, glaciers > 1 km^{2} (0.386 sq mi or 247 acres) and river estuaries.

Tilloy-Floriville is a commune in the Somme department in Hauts-de-France in northern France.

== Geography ==
The commune is situated 15 miles (24 km) southwest of Abbeville, just by the D936 road

== Population ==
Historical population

Year	Pop.	±% p.a.
1926	292	—
1931	300	+0.54%
1936	287	−0.88%
1946	281	−0.21%
1954	292	+0.48%
1962	295	+0.13%
1968	293	−0.11%
1975	273	−1.00%

Year	Pop.	±% p.a.
1982	292	+0.97%
1990	333	+1.66%
1999	324	−0.30%
2007	365	+1.50%
2012	398	+1.75%
2017	393	−0.25%
2023	353	−1.77%

Source: EHESS and INSEE

== See also ==
- Communes of the Somme department
