= Aubermesnil-aux-Érables =

- Commune
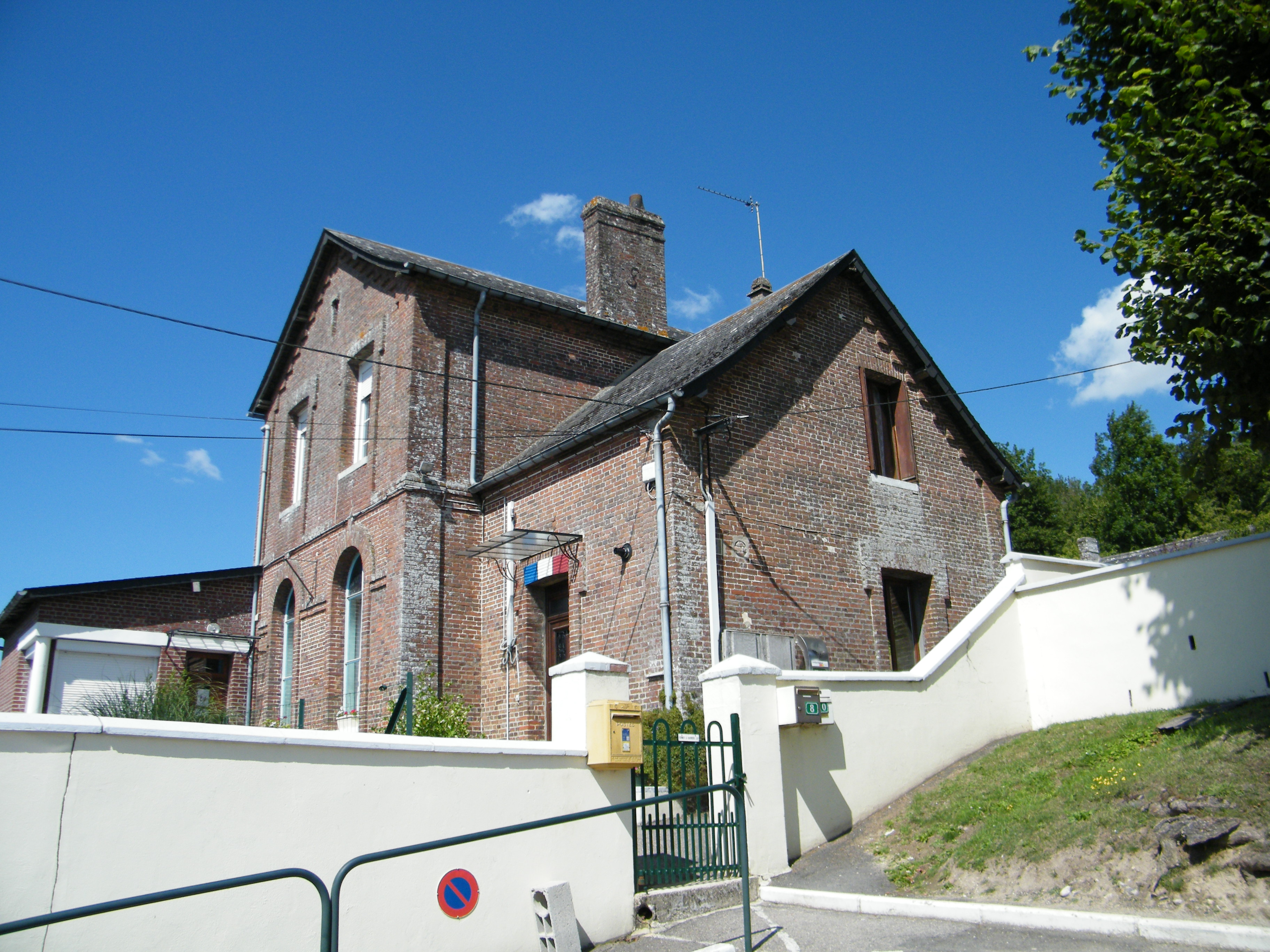
- The town hall in Aubermesnil-aux-Érables
- Location of Aubermesnil-aux-Érables
- Location within France Location within Normandy
- Coordinates: 49°49′35″N 1°34′03″E
- Country: France
- Region: Normandy
- Department: Seine-Maritime
- Arrondissement: Dieppe
- Canton: Eu
- Intercommunality: CC Aumale - Blangy-sur-Bresle

Government
  - Mayor (2026–32): Nicolas Galhaut
- Area^{1}: 8.48 km^{2} (3.27 sq mi)
- Elevation: 125 m (410 ft)
- Highest elevation: 220 m (720 ft)
- Lowest elevation: 123 m (404 ft)
- Population (2023): 195
  - Density: 23.0/km^{2} (59.6/sq mi)
- Time zone: UTC+01:00 (CET)
  - Summer (DST): UTC+02:00 (CEST)
- INSEE/Postal code: 76029 /76340
- ^{1} French Land Register data, which excludes lakes, ponds, glaciers > 1 km^{2} (0.386 sq mi or 247 acres) and river estuaries.

Aubermesnil-aux-Érables is a commune in the Seine-Maritime department in the Normandy region in northern France.

== Geography ==
A small farming village in the Pays de Bray, situated some 24 miles (39 km) southeast of Dieppe, at the junction of the D24 and D16 roads. It is surrounded by the lower Eu Forest and is the source of the river Yères.

== Population ==
Historical population
Year	Pop.	±% p.a.
1968	215	—
1975	204	−0.75%
1982	197	−0.50%
1990	191	−0.39%
1999	203	+0.68%
2007	224	+1.24%
2012	201	−2.14%
2017	203	+0.20%
2023	195	−0.67%
Source: INSEE

== Places of interest ==
- The church dating from the eleventh century.
- The chapel, rebuilt in the 18th century.
- The forest of Eu.

== Notable people ==
The French actor Bourvil bought a farm here and spent much time in the village.

== See also ==
- Communes of the Seine-Maritime department
