= Biencourt, Somme =

Biencourt
- Commune
- The town hall and school in Biencourt

- Coat of arms
- Location of Biencourt
- Location within France Location within Hauts-de-France
- Coordinates: 49°58′35″N 1°41′36″E
- Country: France
- Region: Hauts-de-France
- Department: Somme
- Arrondissement: Abbeville
- Canton: Gamaches
- Intercommunality: CC Aumale - Blangy-sur-Bresle

Government
  - Mayor (2020–2026): Gilles Loubat
- Area^{1}: 2.22 km^{2} (0.86 sq mi)
- Elevation: 116 m (381 ft)
- Highest elevation: 129 m (423 ft)
- Lowest elevation: 98 m (322 ft)
- Population (2023): 137
  - Density: 61.7/km^{2} (160/sq mi)
- Time zone: UTC+01:00 (CET)
  - Summer (DST): UTC+02:00 (CEST)
- INSEE/Postal code: 80104 /80140
- ^{1} French Land Register data, which excludes lakes, ponds, glaciers > 1 km^{2} (0.386 sq mi or 247 acres) and river estuaries.

Biencourt (French pronunciation: [bjɛ̃kuʁ]) is a commune in the Somme department in Hauts-de-France in northern France.

== Geography ==
Biencourt is situated 22 miles (35 km) southwest of Abbeville on the D263 road, about a mile from the A28 autoroute.

== Population ==
Historical population
| Year | Pop. | ±% p.a. |
|---|---|---|
| 1968 | 137 | — |
| 1975 | 115 | −2.47% |
| 1982 | 114 | −0.12% |
| 1990 | 120 | +0.64% |
| 1999 | 116 | −0.38% |
| 2007 | 123 | +0.74% |
| 2012 | 127 | +0.64% |
| 2017 | 133 | +0.93% |
| 2023 | 137 | +0.50% |
Source: INSEE

== See also ==
- Communes of the Somme department
