= Bouttencourt =

- Commune
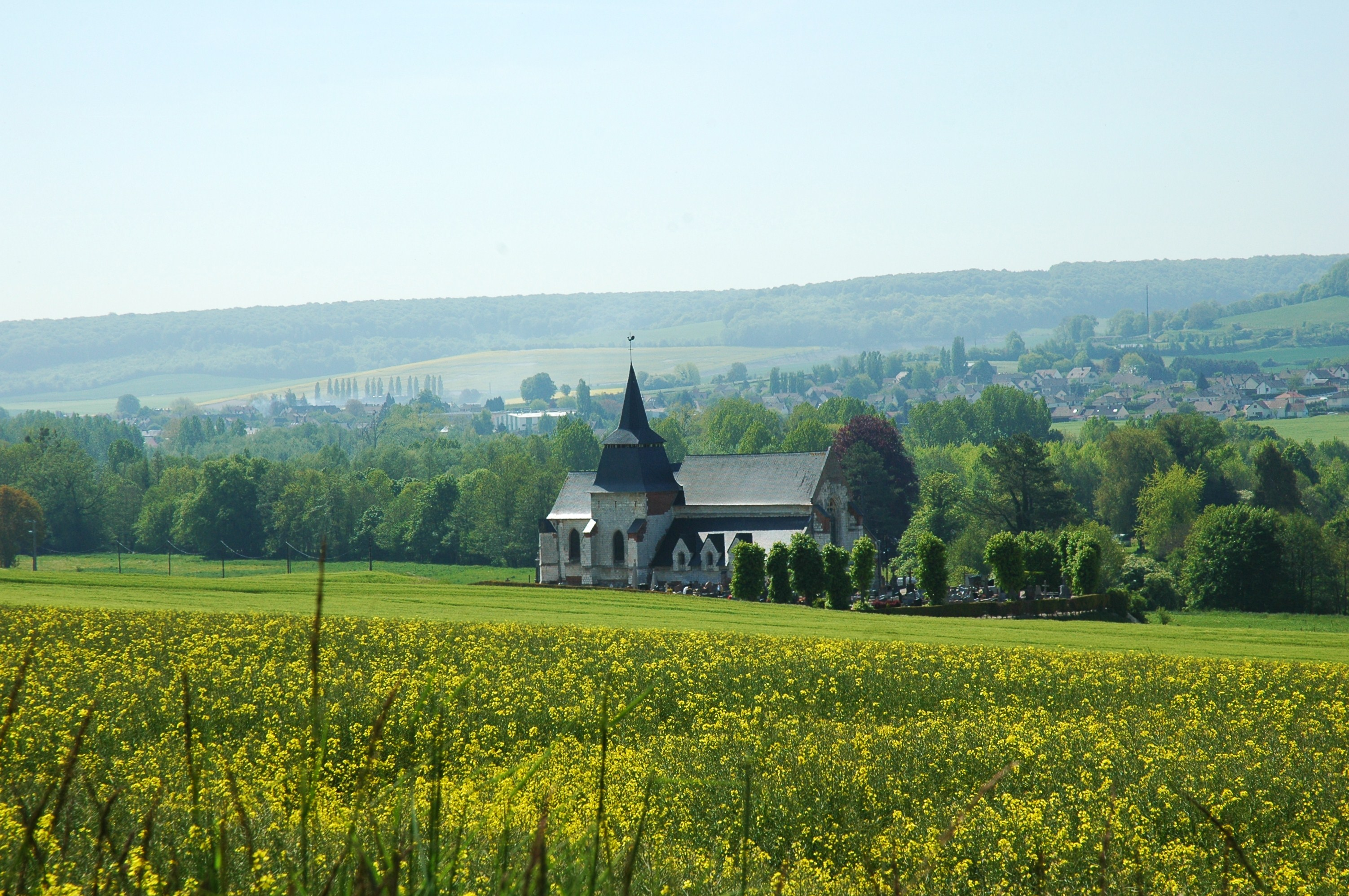
- The church in Bouttencourt

- Coat of arms
- Location of Bouttencourt
- Location within France Location within Hauts-de-France
- Coordinates: 49°56′10″N 1°37′53″E
- Country: France
- Region: Hauts-de-France
- Department: Somme
- Arrondissement: Abbeville
- Canton: Gamaches
- Intercommunality: CC Aumale - Blangy-sur-Bresle

Government
  - Mayor (2020–2026): André Bayart
- Area^{1}: 7.73 km^{2} (2.98 sq mi)
- Elevation: 19 m (62 ft)
- Highest elevation: 161 m (528 ft)
- Lowest elevation: 31 m (102 ft)
- Population (2023): 927
  - Density: 120/km^{2} (311/sq mi)
- Time zone: UTC+01:00 (CET)
  - Summer (DST): UTC+02:00 (CEST)
- INSEE/Postal code: 80126 /80220
- ^{1} French Land Register data, which excludes lakes, ponds, glaciers > 1 km^{2} (0.386 sq mi or 247 acres) and river estuaries.

Bouttencourt (French pronunciation: [butɑ̃kuʁ]; Picard: Boutincourt) is a commune in the Somme department in Hauts-de-France in northern France.

== Geography ==
Bouttencourt is situated on the D928 and D1015 crossroads, by the banks of the river Bresle, the border with the Seine-Maritime département, some 18 miles (29 km) southwest of Abbeville.

== Population ==
Historical population

Year	Pop.	±% p.a.
1946	755	—
1954	754	−0.02%
1962	777	+0.38%
1968	741	−0.79%
1975	887	+2.60%
1982	928	+0.65%

Year	Pop.	±% p.a.
1990	941	+0.17%
1999	1,015	+0.84%
2007	1,052	+0.45%
2012	988	−1.25%
2017	931	−1.18%
2023	927	−0.07%

Source: EHESS and INSEE (1968-2023)

== See also ==
- Communes of the Somme department
