= Villers-sous-Foucarmont =

- Commune
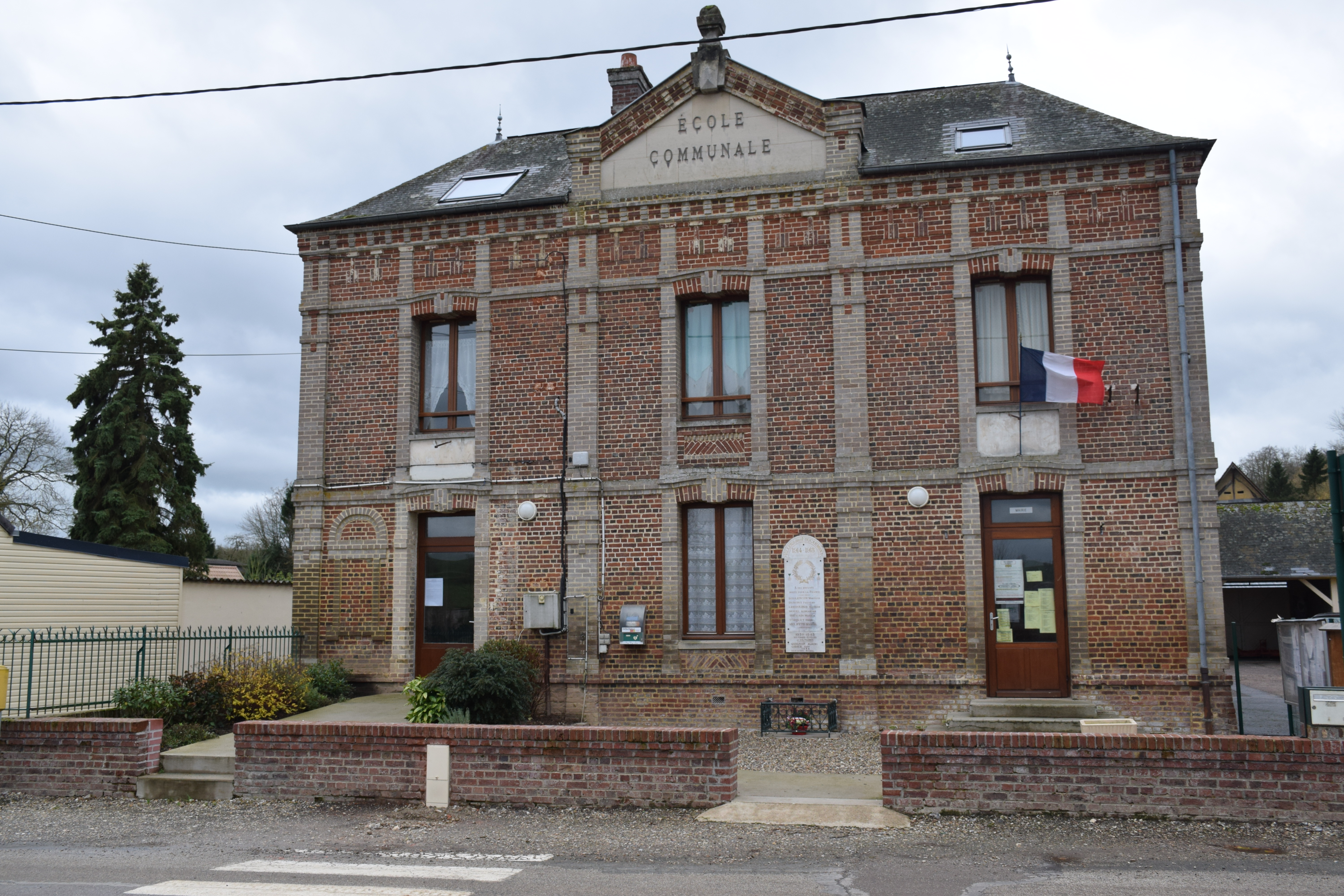
- The town hall in Villers-sous-Foucarmont
- Location of Villers-sous-Foucarmont
- Location within France Location within Normandy
- Coordinates: 49°50′20″N 1°33′51″E
- Country: France
- Region: Normandy
- Department: Seine-Maritime
- Arrondissement: Dieppe
- Canton: Eu
- Intercommunality: CC Aumale - Blangy-sur-Bresle

Government
  - Mayor (2026–32): Jean-Christophe Sannier
- Area^{1}: 7.01 km^{2} (2.71 sq mi)
- Elevation: 121 m (397 ft)
- Highest elevation: 223 m (732 ft)
- Lowest elevation: 112 m (367 ft)
- Population (2023): 181
  - Density: 25.8/km^{2} (66.9/sq mi)
- Time zone: UTC+01:00 (CET)
  - Summer (DST): UTC+02:00 (CEST)
- INSEE/Postal code: 76744 /76340
- ^{1} French Land Register data, which excludes lakes, ponds, glaciers > 1 km^{2} (0.386 sq mi or 247 acres) and river estuaries.

Villers-sous-Foucarmont (French pronunciation: [vilɛʁ su fukaʁmɔ̃], lit. 'Villers under Foucarmont') is a commune in the Seine-Maritime department in the Normandy region in northern France.

== Geography ==
A small farming village situated by the banks of the Yères river in the Pays de Bray, some 22 miles (35 km) southeast of Dieppe at the junction of the D16, D24 and the D82 roads.

== Population ==
Historical population
Year	Pop.	±% p.a.
1968	164	—
1975	170	+0.51%
1982	160	−0.86%
1990	172	+0.91%
1999	205	+1.97%
2007	201	−0.25%
2012	197	−0.40%
2017	193	−0.41%
2023	181	−1.06%
Source: INSEE

== Places of interest ==
- The church of St. Vincent, dating from the sixteenth century.
- The château de La Quesnoy, dating from the sixteenth century, with its chapel.

== See also ==
- Communes of the Seine-Maritime department
