= Vismes =

- Commune
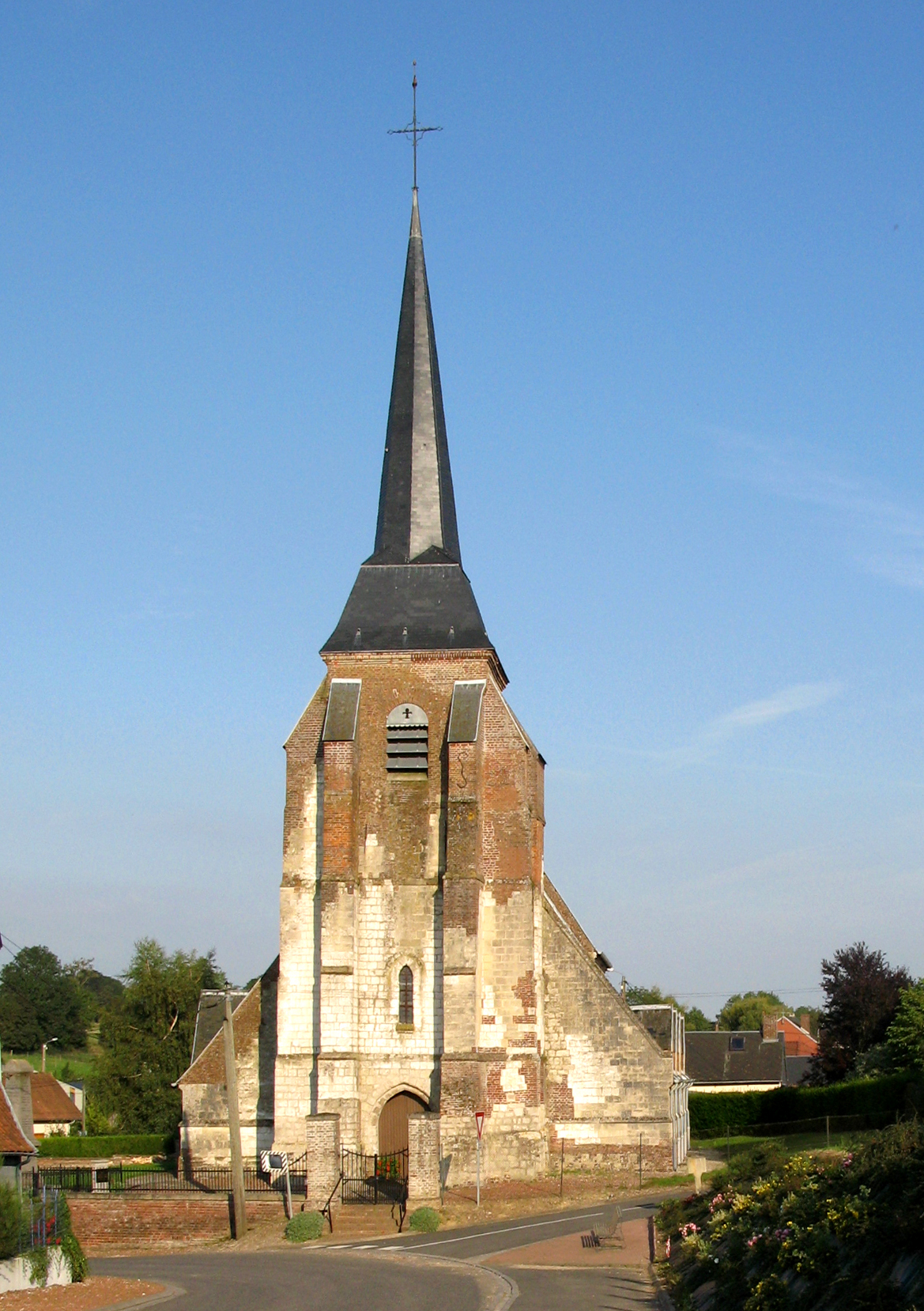
- The church in Vismes
- Location of Vismes
- Location within France Location within Hauts-de-France
- Coordinates: 50°00′46″N 1°40′24″E
- Country: France
- Region: Hauts-de-France
- Department: Somme
- Arrondissement: Abbeville
- Canton: Gamaches
- Intercommunality: CC Aumale - Blangy-sur-Bresle

Government
  - Mayor (2020–2026): Nicolas Plé
- Area^{1}: 13.26 km^{2} (5.12 sq mi)
- Elevation: 79 m (259 ft)
- Highest elevation: 124 m (407 ft)
- Lowest elevation: 71 m (233 ft)
- Population (2023): 474
  - Density: 35.7/km^{2} (92.6/sq mi)
- Time zone: UTC+01:00 (CET)
  - Summer (DST): UTC+02:00 (CEST)
- INSEE/Postal code: 80809 /80140
- ^{1} French Land Register data, which excludes lakes, ponds, glaciers > 1 km^{2} (0.386 sq mi or 247 acres) and river estuaries.

Vismes (French pronunciation: [vim]) is a commune in the Somme department in Hauts-de-France in northern France.

== Geography ==
Vismes is situated 10 miles(16 km) southwest of Abbeville, on the D190 road

== History ==
The chateau of Vismes was built by the seigneurs of Vismes, as documented by Théobald in 1066 (the name of Vismes could then be written with or without the final "s"). The Marquis de Belleval added: "the ruins still stood in the last century". The castle was destroyed by John of Gaunt, 1st Duke of Lancaster in 1372. The Seigneurie of Vismes passed to the house of Cayeu in the 14th century and then to that of Monchy in the following century, until 1785 when André de Monchy died.

Between 1790 and 1794 Vismes absorbed the hamlets of Morival, Le Plouy and Wiammeville.

== Population ==
Historical population
Year	Pop.	±% p.a.
1968	395	—
1975	367	−1.04%
1982	326	−1.68%
1990	314	−0.47%
1999	306	−0.29%
2007	355	+1.87%
2012	449	+4.81%
2017	483	+1.47%
2023	474	−0.31%
Source: INSEE

== See also ==
- Communes of the Somme department
