= Canton of Eu =

Coordinates: 49°59′55″N 1°24′42″E

Eu
- Canton
- Country: France
- Region: Normandy
- Department: Seine-Maritime
- No. of communes: {{{nbcomm}}}
- Area: 379.74 km^{2} (146.62 sq mi)
- Population (2023): 33,313
  - Density: 87.726/km^{2} (227.21/sq mi)
- INSEE code: 76 10

The Canton of Eu is a canton situated in the Seine-Maritime département and in the Normandy region of northern France.

== Geography ==
An area of farming, fishing, forestry and light industry (especially glassmaking) in the arrondissement of Dieppe, centred on the town of Eu. The altitude varies from 0m (Villy-sur-Yères) to 189m (Melleville) for an average altitude of 57m.

== Composition ==
At the French canton reorganisation which came into effect in March 2015, the canton was expanded from 22 to 40 communes:

- Aubermesnil-aux-Érables
- Baromesnil
- Bazinval
- Blangy-sur-Bresle
- Campneuseville
- Canehan
- Criel-sur-Mer
- Cuverville-sur-Yères
- Dancourt
- Étalondes
- Eu
- Fallencourt
- Flocques
- Foucarmont
- Guerville
- Hodeng-au-Bosc
- Incheville
- Longroy
- Melleville
- Le Mesnil-Réaume
- Millebosc
- Monchaux-Soreng
- Monchy-sur-Eu
- Nesle-Normandeuse
- Pierrecourt
- Ponts-et-Marais
- Réalcamp
- Rétonval
- Rieux
- Saint-Léger-aux-Bois
- Saint-Martin-au-Bosc
- Saint-Martin-le-Gaillard
- Saint-Pierre-en-Val
- Saint-Rémy-Boscrocourt
- Saint-Riquier-en-Rivière
- Sept-Meules
- Touffreville-sur-Eu
- Le Tréport
- Villers-sous-Foucarmont
- Villy-sur-Yères

== Population ==
Historical population
Year	Pop.	±% p.a.
2013	35,650	—
2018	34,474	−0.67%
Source: INSEE

== See also ==
- Arrondissements of the Seine-Maritime department
- Cantons of the Seine-Maritime department
- Communes of the Seine-Maritime department
