= Bouillancourt-en-Séry =

- Commune
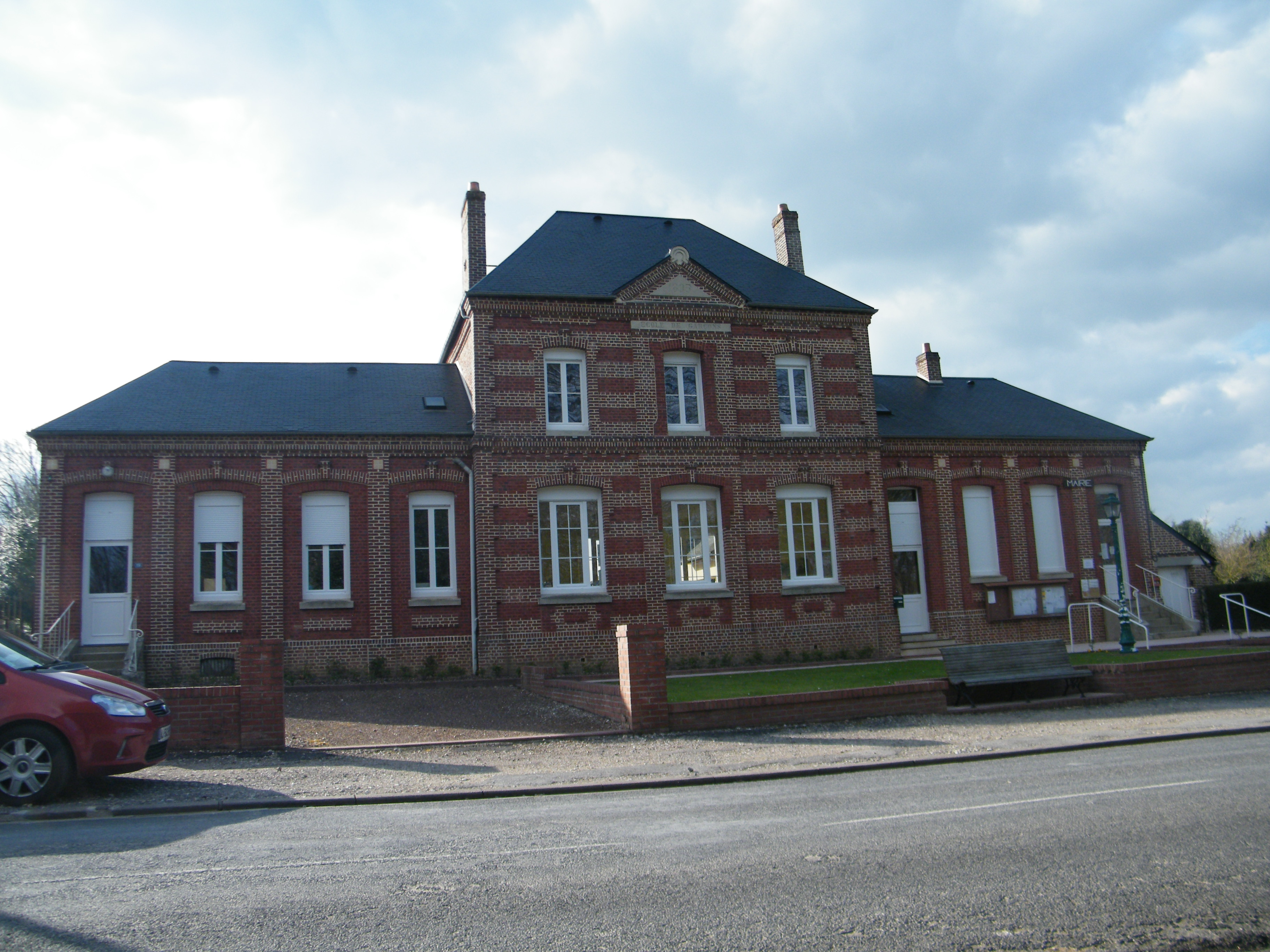
- The town hall and school in Bouillancourt-en-Séry
- Location of Bouillancourt-en-Séry
- Location within France Location within Hauts-de-France
- Coordinates: 49°57′45″N 1°37′45″E
- Country: France
- Region: Hauts-de-France
- Department: Somme
- Arrondissement: Abbeville
- Canton: Gamaches
- Intercommunality: CC Aumale - Blangy-sur-Bresle

Government
  - Mayor (2020–2026): Xavier Duval
- Area^{1}: 16.11 km^{2} (6.22 sq mi)
- Elevation: 128 m (420 ft)
- Highest elevation: 181 m (594 ft)
- Lowest elevation: 63 m (207 ft)
- Population (2023): 540
  - Density: 34/km^{2} (87/sq mi)
- Time zone: UTC+01:00 (CET)
  - Summer (DST): UTC+02:00 (CEST)
- INSEE/Postal code: 80120 /80220
- ^{1} French Land Register data, which excludes lakes, ponds, glaciers > 1 km^{2} (0.386 sq mi or 247 acres) and river estuaries.

Bouillancourt-en-Séry (French pronunciation: [bujɑ̃kuʁ ɑ̃ seʁi]; Picard: Bouillincourt-in-Sry) is a commune in the Somme department in Hauts-de-France in northern France.

== Geography ==
The commune is situated by the banks of the river Bresle, the border with the Seine-Maritime département, on the D67 road, some 22 miles (35 km) southwest of Abbeville.

== Population ==
Historical population

Year	Pop.	±% p.a.
1851	1,155	—
1901	663	−1.10%
1936	488	−0.87%
1946	434	−1.17%
1954	493	+1.61%
1962	506	+0.33%
1968	478	−0.94%
1975	484	+0.18%

Year	Pop.	±% p.a.
1982	467	−0.51%
1990	469	+0.05%
1999	486	+0.40%
2007	533	+1.16%
2012	566	+1.21%
2017	550	−0.57%
2023	540	−0.31%

Source: EHESS and INSEE (1968-2023)

== See also ==
- Communes of the Somme department
