= Monchy-le-Preux (hamlet) =

Coordinates: 49°52′50″N 1°40′0″E

Monchy-le-Preux is a hamlet in the commune of Campneuseville, in the Seine-Maritime department of France. It was a former commune of Normandy, and has been joined to Campneuseville in 1823.
