= Frettemeule =

- Commune
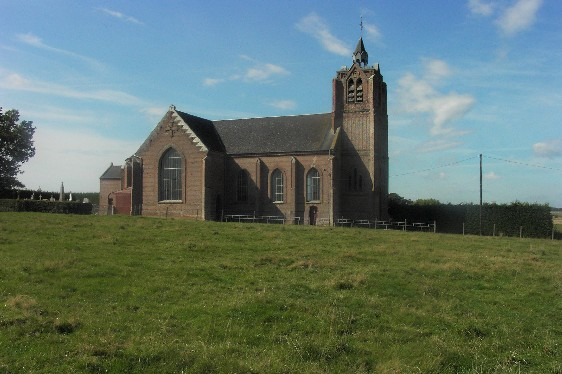
- The church in Frettemeule

- Coat of arms
- Location of Frettemeule
- Location within France Location within Hauts-de-France
- Coordinates: 50°00′43″N 1°38′36″E
- Country: France
- Region: Hauts-de-France
- Department: Somme
- Arrondissement: Abbeville
- Canton: Gamaches
- Intercommunality: CC Aumale - Blangy-sur-Bresle

Government
  - Mayor (2020–2026): Jean-Claude Brailly
- Area^{1}: 7.45 km^{2} (2.88 sq mi)
- Elevation: 90 m (300 ft)
- Highest elevation: 127 m (417 ft)
- Lowest elevation: 61 m (200 ft)
- Population (2023): 296
  - Density: 39.7/km^{2} (103/sq mi)
- Time zone: UTC+01:00 (CET)
  - Summer (DST): UTC+02:00 (CEST)
- INSEE/Postal code: 80362 /80220
- ^{1} French Land Register data, which excludes lakes, ponds, glaciers > 1 km^{2} (0.386 sq mi or 247 acres) and river estuaries.

Frettemeule (French pronunciation: [fʁɛtmøl]; Picard: Frécmole) is a commune in the Somme department in Hauts-de-France in northern France.

== Geography ==
Frettemeule is situated on the D190 road, some 21 km (13 mi) southwest of Abbeville.

== Population ==
Historical population
Year	Pop.	±% p.a.
1968	344	—
1975	321	−0.98%
1982	318	−0.13%
1990	312	−0.24%
1999	238	−2.96%
2007	266	+1.40%
2012	293	+1.95%
2017	324	+2.03%
2023	296	−1.50%
Source: INSEE

== See also ==
- Communes of the Somme department
