= Monchaux-Soreng =

- Commune
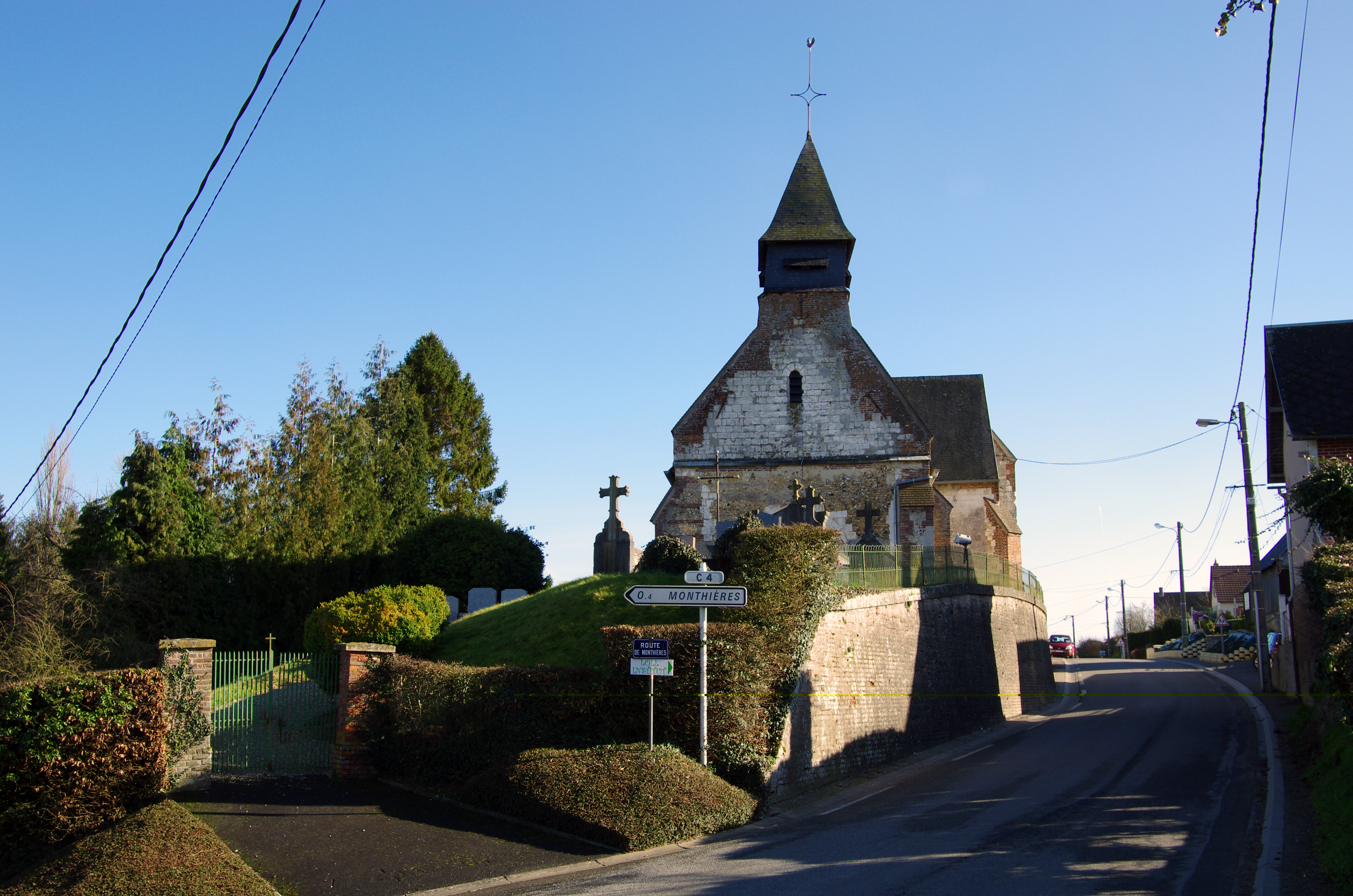
- The church in Soreng

- Coat of arms
- Location of Monchaux-Soreng
- Location within France Location within Normandy
- Coordinates: 49°56′57″N 1°35′38″E
- Country: France
- Region: Normandy
- Department: Seine-Maritime
- Arrondissement: Dieppe
- Canton: Eu
- Intercommunality: CC Aumale - Blangy-sur-Bresle

Government
  - Mayor (2026–32): Jean-Claude Quénot
- Area^{1}: 10.05 km^{2} (3.88 sq mi)
- Elevation: 75 m (246 ft)
- Highest elevation: 201 m (659 ft)
- Lowest elevation: 27 m (89 ft)
- Population (2023): 607
  - Density: 60.4/km^{2} (156/sq mi)
- Time zone: UTC+01:00 (CET)
  - Summer (DST): UTC+02:00 (CEST)
- INSEE/Postal code: 76441 /76340
- ^{1} French Land Register data, which excludes lakes, ponds, glaciers > 1 km^{2} (0.386 sq mi or 247 acres) and river estuaries.

Monchaux-Soreng (French pronunciation: [mɔ̃ʃo sɔʁɑ̃]) is a commune in the Seine-Maritime department in the Normandy region in northern France.

== Geography ==
A forestry and farming village situated alongside the banks of the river Bresle in the Pays de Bray, some 22 miles (35 km) east of Dieppe at the junction of the D49, the D149 and the D407 roads.

== Population ==
Historical population
Year	Pop.	±% p.a.
1968	438	—
1975	481	+1.35%
1982	576	+2.61%
1990	644	+1.40%
1999	668	+0.41%
2007	643	−0.48%
2012	647	+0.12%
2017	654	+0.22%
2023	607	−1.24%
Source: INSEE

== Places of interest ==
- The two churches of St.Martin, both dating from the thirteenth century.
- A chapel dedicated to St.Milfort.
- Traces of a feudal castle.

== See also ==
- Communes of the Seine-Maritime department
