= Guerville, Seine-Maritime =

Guerville
- Commune
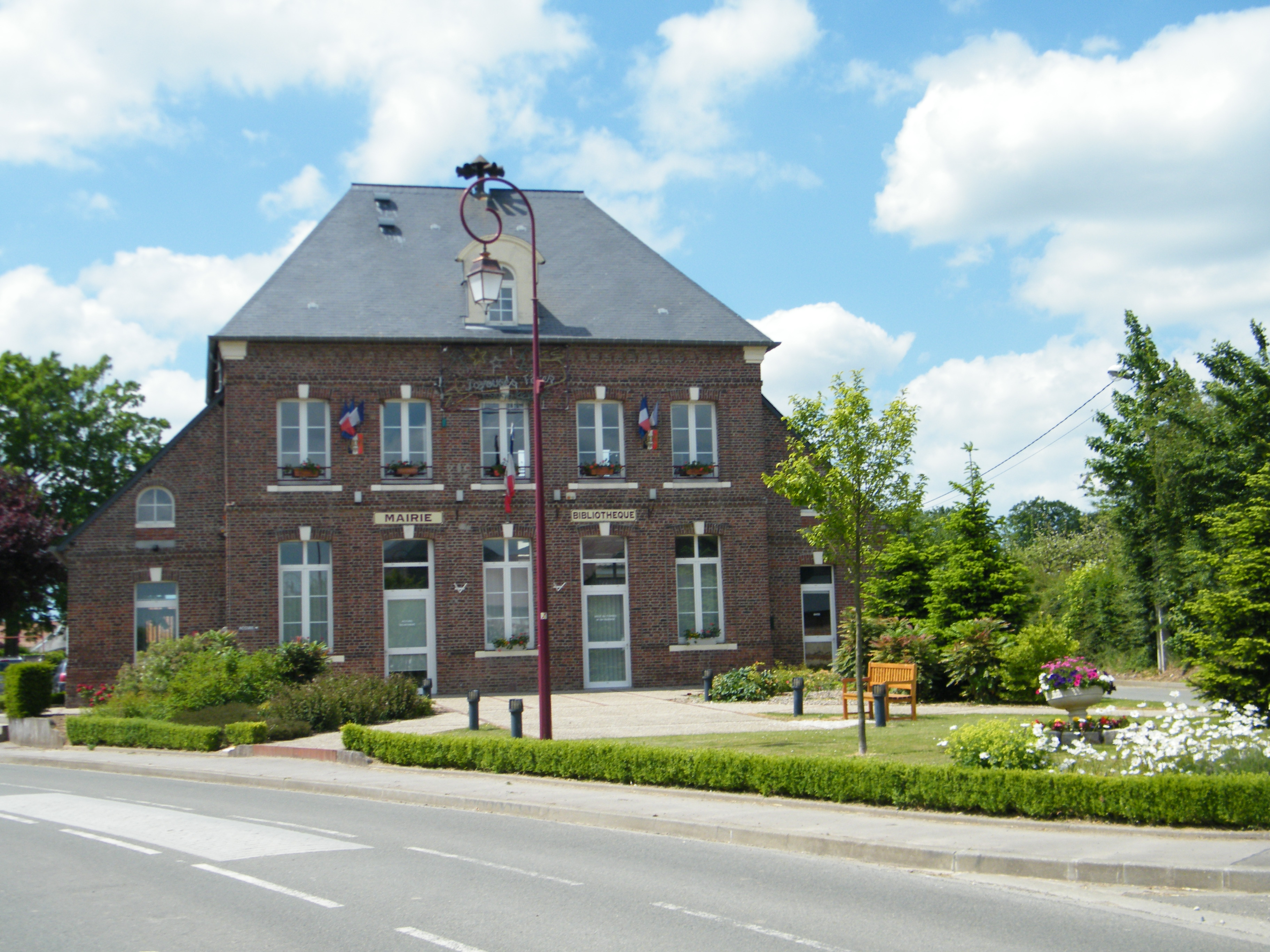
- The town hall in Guerville
- Location of Guerville
- Location within France Location within Normandy
- Coordinates: 49°57′34″N 1°30′53″E
- Country: France
- Region: Normandy
- Department: Seine-Maritime
- Arrondissement: Dieppe
- Canton: Eu
- Intercommunality: CC Aumale - Blangy-sur-Bresle

Government
  - Mayor (2026–32): Étienne Lannel
- Area^{1}: 12.46 km^{2} (4.81 sq mi)
- Elevation: 165 m (541 ft)
- Highest elevation: 198 m (650 ft)
- Lowest elevation: 75 m (246 ft)
- Population (2023): 458
  - Density: 36.8/km^{2} (95.2/sq mi)
- Time zone: UTC+01:00 (CET)
  - Summer (DST): UTC+02:00 (CEST)
- INSEE/Postal code: 76333 /76340
- ^{1} French Land Register data, which excludes lakes, ponds, glaciers > 1 km^{2} (0.386 sq mi or 247 acres) and river estuaries.

Guerville (French pronunciation: [ɡɛʁvil]) is a commune in the Seine-Maritime department in the Normandy region in northern France.

== Geography ==
A village of farming, forestry and light industry situated in the valley of the river Bresle, in the Pays de Bray, some 20 miles (32 km) east of Dieppe at the junction of the D14, the D115 and the D126 roads.

== Population ==
Historical population
Year	Pop.	±% p.a.
1968	449	—
1975	439	−0.32%
1982	438	−0.03%
1990	443	+0.14%
1999	408	−0.91%
2007	438	+0.89%
2012	470	+1.42%
2017	473	+0.13%
2023	458	−0.54%
Source: INSEE

== Places of interest ==
- The remains (a motte and moat) of the old Norman castle.
- The church of St. Gilles, dating from the nineteenth century.
- The nineteenth century Château de la Grande-Vallée.
- The Château de La Haye.

== See also ==
- Communes of the Seine-Maritime department
