= Réalcamp =

- Commune
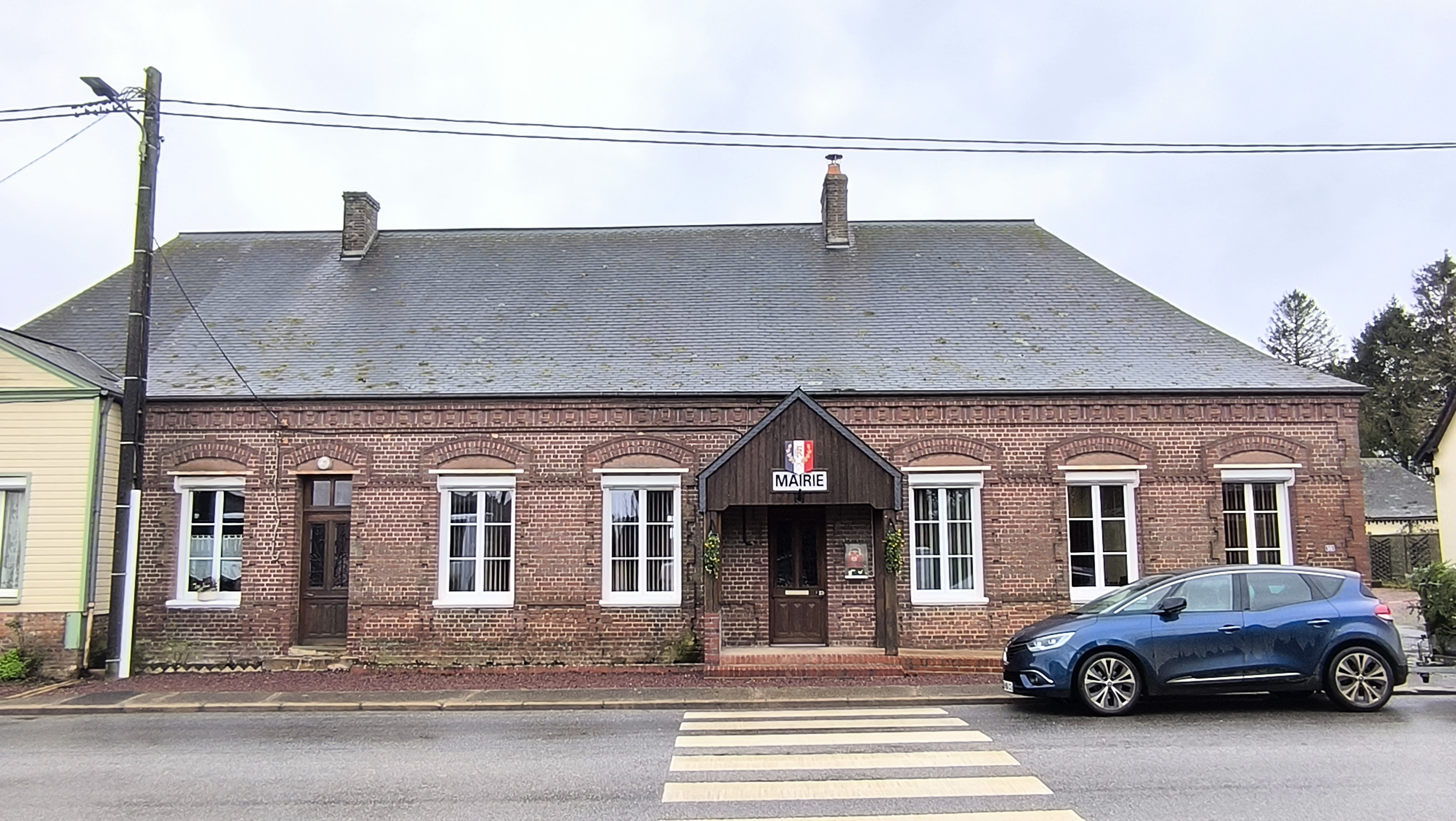
- Réalcamp Town hall
- Location of Réalcamp
- Location within France Location within Normandy
- Coordinates: 49°51′12″N 1°37′21″E
- Country: France
- Region: Normandy
- Department: Seine-Maritime
- Arrondissement: Dieppe
- Canton: Eu
- Intercommunality: CC Aumale - Blangy-sur-Bresle

Government
  - Mayor (2026–32): Thierry Blondin
- Area^{1}: 11.45 km^{2} (4.42 sq mi)
- Elevation: 211 m (692 ft)
- Highest elevation: 216 m (709 ft)
- Lowest elevation: 135 m (443 ft)
- Population (2023): 594
  - Density: 51.9/km^{2} (134/sq mi)
- Time zone: UTC+01:00 (CET)
  - Summer (DST): UTC+02:00 (CEST)
- INSEE/Postal code: 76520 /76340
- ^{1} French Land Register data, which excludes lakes, ponds, glaciers > 1 km^{2} (0.386 sq mi or 247 acres) and river estuaries.

Réalcamp (French pronunciation: [ʁealkɑ̃]) is a commune in the Seine-Maritime department in the Normandy region in northern France.

== Geography ==
A forestry and farming village situated in the Pays de Bray at the junction of the D7, D116 and the D407 roads, some 26 miles (42 km) east of Dieppe.

== Population ==
Historical population
Year	Pop.	±% p.a.
1968	581	—
1975	582	+0.02%
1982	607	+0.60%
1990	572	−0.74%
1999	614	+0.79%
2007	658	+0.87%
2012	668	+0.30%
2017	627	−1.26%
2023	594	−0.90%
Source: INSEE

== Places of interest ==
- The church of St.Christophe, dating from the sixteenth century.

== See also ==
- Communes of the Seine-Maritime department
