= Hodeng-au-Bosc =

- Commune
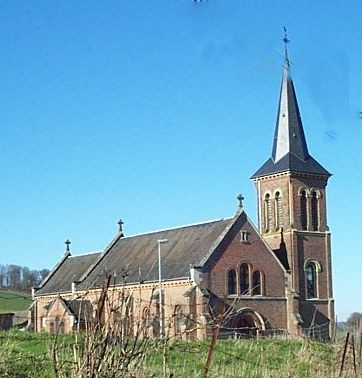
- The church in Hodeng-au-Bosc
- Location of Hodeng-au-Bosc
- Location within France Location within Normandy
- Coordinates: 49°51′46″N 1°42′30″E
- Country: France
- Region: Normandy
- Department: Seine-Maritime
- Arrondissement: Dieppe
- Canton: Eu
- Intercommunality: CC Aumale - Blangy-sur-Bresle

Government
  - Mayor (2020–2026): Claude Santerre
- Area^{1}: 8.77 km^{2} (3.39 sq mi)
- Elevation: 100 m (330 ft)
- Highest elevation: 205 m (673 ft)
- Lowest elevation: 61 m (200 ft)
- Population (2023): 559
  - Density: 63.7/km^{2} (165/sq mi)
- Time zone: UTC+01:00 (CET)
  - Summer (DST): UTC+02:00 (CEST)
- INSEE/Postal code: 76363 /76340
- ^{1} French Land Register data, which excludes lakes, ponds, glaciers > 1 km^{2} (0.386 sq mi or 247 acres) and river estuaries.

Hodeng-au-Bosc (French pronunciation: [ɔdɑ̃ o bɔsk]) is a commune in the Seine-Maritime department in the Normandy region of northern France.

== Geography ==
A forestry and farming village is situated in the valley of the river Bresle in the Pays de Bray, some 33 miles (53 km) southeast of Dieppe at the junction of the D7, the D246 and the D49 roads. The commune also features a glassmaking factory, founded in 1623.

== Population ==
Historical population
Year	Pop.	±% p.a.
1968	444	—
1975	507	+1.91%
1982	541	+0.93%
1990	576	+0.79%
1999	555	−0.41%
2007	591	+0.79%
2012	568	−0.79%
2017	575	+0.25%
2023	559	−0.47%
Source: INSEE

== Places of interest ==
- The church of St. Denis, dating from the nineteenth century.
- The church of St. Sauveur at Guimerville, dating from the sixteenth century.

== People ==
Jean-Luc Thérier, racing driver for the Alpine Renault team in the 1970s, was born here in 1945.

== See also ==
- Communes of the Seine-Maritime department
