= Fallencourt =

- Commune
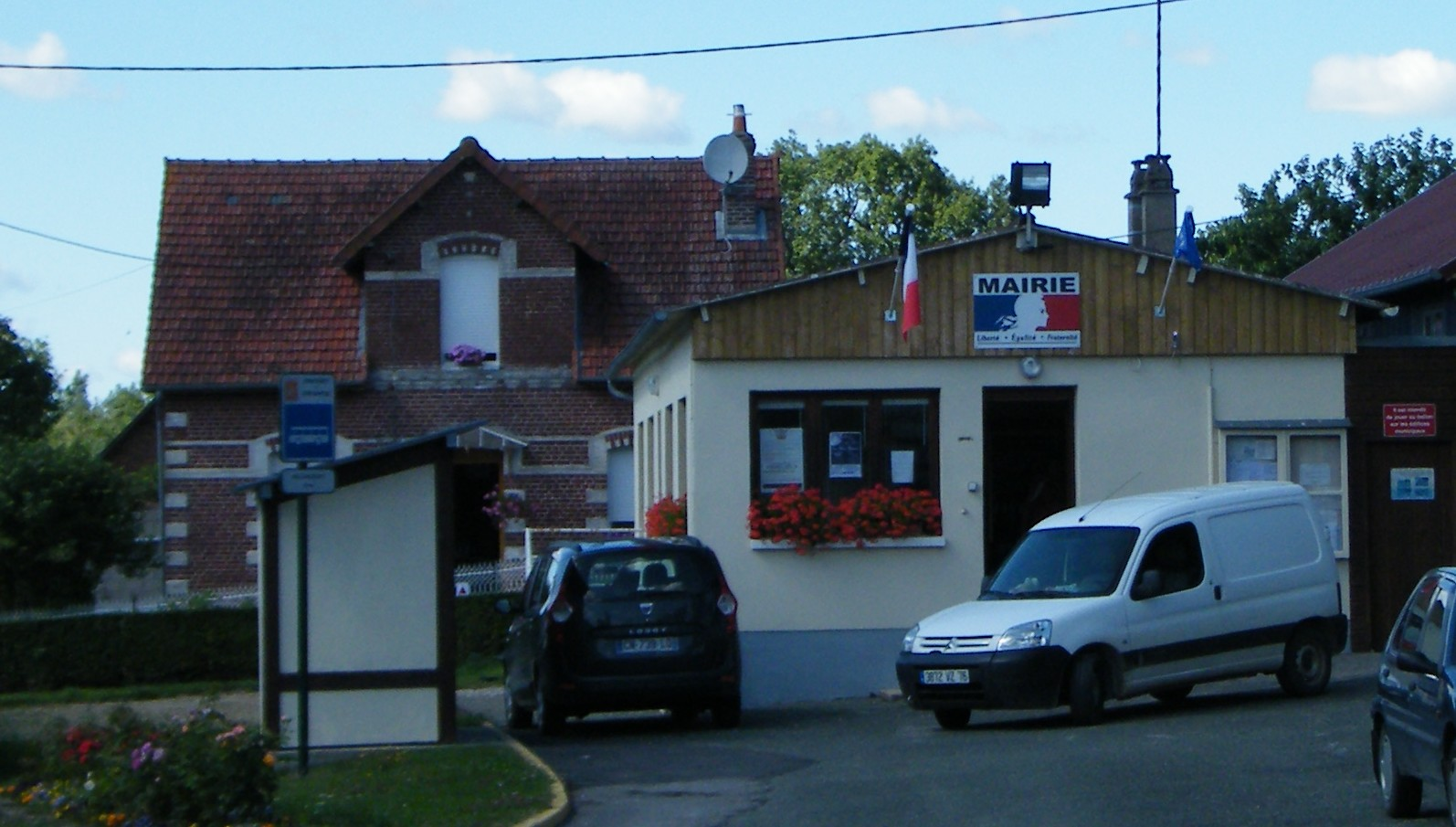
- The town hall in Fallencourt

- Coat of arms
- Location of Fallencourt
- Location within France Location within Normandy
- Coordinates: 49°52′05″N 1°34′06″E
- Country: France
- Region: Normandy
- Department: Seine-Maritime
- Arrondissement: Dieppe
- Canton: Eu
- Intercommunality: CC Aumale - Blangy-sur-Bresle

Government
  - Mayor (2026–32): Jean-Pierre Delobel
- Area^{1}: 12.08 km^{2} (4.66 sq mi)
- Elevation: 110 m (360 ft)
- Highest elevation: 215 m (705 ft)
- Lowest elevation: 98 m (322 ft)
- Population (2023): 176
  - Density: 14.6/km^{2} (37.7/sq mi)
- Time zone: UTC+01:00 (CET)
  - Summer (DST): UTC+02:00 (CEST)
- INSEE/Postal code: 76257 /76340
- ^{1} French Land Register data, which excludes lakes, ponds, glaciers > 1 km^{2} (0.386 sq mi or 247 acres) and river estuaries.

Fallencourt (French pronunciation: [falɑ̃kuʁ]) is a commune in the Seine-Maritime department in the Normandy region in northern France.

== Geography ==
A small farming and forestry village situated by the banks of the river Yères in the Pays de Caux, some 25 miles (40 km) southeast of Dieppe, at the junction of the D216 and the D928 roads. The A28 autoroute passes through the commune's territory.

== Population ==
Historical population
Year	Pop.	±% p.a.
1968	243	—
1975	221	−1.35%
1982	207	−0.93%
1990	179	−1.80%
1999	148	−2.09%
2007	177	+2.26%
2012	192	+1.64%
2017	188	−0.42%
2023	176	−1.09%
Source: INSEE

== Places of interest ==
- Remains of a moated feudal motte.
- The church, dating from the sixteenth century.

== See also ==
- Communes of the Seine-Maritime department
