= Pierrecourt, Seine-Maritime =

Pierrecourt
- Commune
- Coat of arms
- Location of Pierrecourt
- Location within France Location within Normandy
- Coordinates: 49°53′50″N 1°39′36″E
- Country: France
- Region: Normandy
- Department: Seine-Maritime
- Arrondissement: Dieppe
- Canton: Eu
- Intercommunality: CC Aumale - Blangy-sur-Bresle

Government
  - Mayor (2026–32): Jean-Paul Morel
- Area^{1}: 9.51 km^{2} (3.67 sq mi)
- Elevation: 80 m (260 ft)
- Highest elevation: 216 m (709 ft)
- Lowest elevation: 71 m (233 ft)
- Population (2023): 474
  - Density: 49.8/km^{2} (129/sq mi)
- Time zone: UTC+01:00 (CET)
  - Summer (DST): UTC+02:00 (CEST)
- INSEE/Postal code: 76500 /76340
- ^{1} French Land Register data, which excludes lakes, ponds, glaciers > 1 km^{2} (0.386 sq mi or 247 acres) and river estuaries.

Pierrecourt (French pronunciation: [pjɛʁkuʁ]) is a commune in the Seine-Maritime department in the Normandy region in northern France.

== Geography ==
A village of farming and forestry situated in the Bresle valley in the Pays de Bray at the junction of the D116 and the D260 roads, some 26 miles (42 km) east of Dieppe.

== Population ==
Historical population
Year	Pop.	±% p.a.
1968	504	—
1975	480	−0.69%
1982	460	−0.61%
1990	422	−1.07%
1999	455	+0.84%
2007	466	+0.30%
2012	481	+0.64%
2017	476	−0.21%
2023	474	−0.07%
Source: INSEE

== Places of interest ==
- The church of St.Pierre, dating from the sixteenth century.

== See also ==
- Communes of the Seine-Maritime department
