= Saint-Léger-aux-Bois, Seine-Maritime =

Saint-Léger-aux-Bois
- Commune
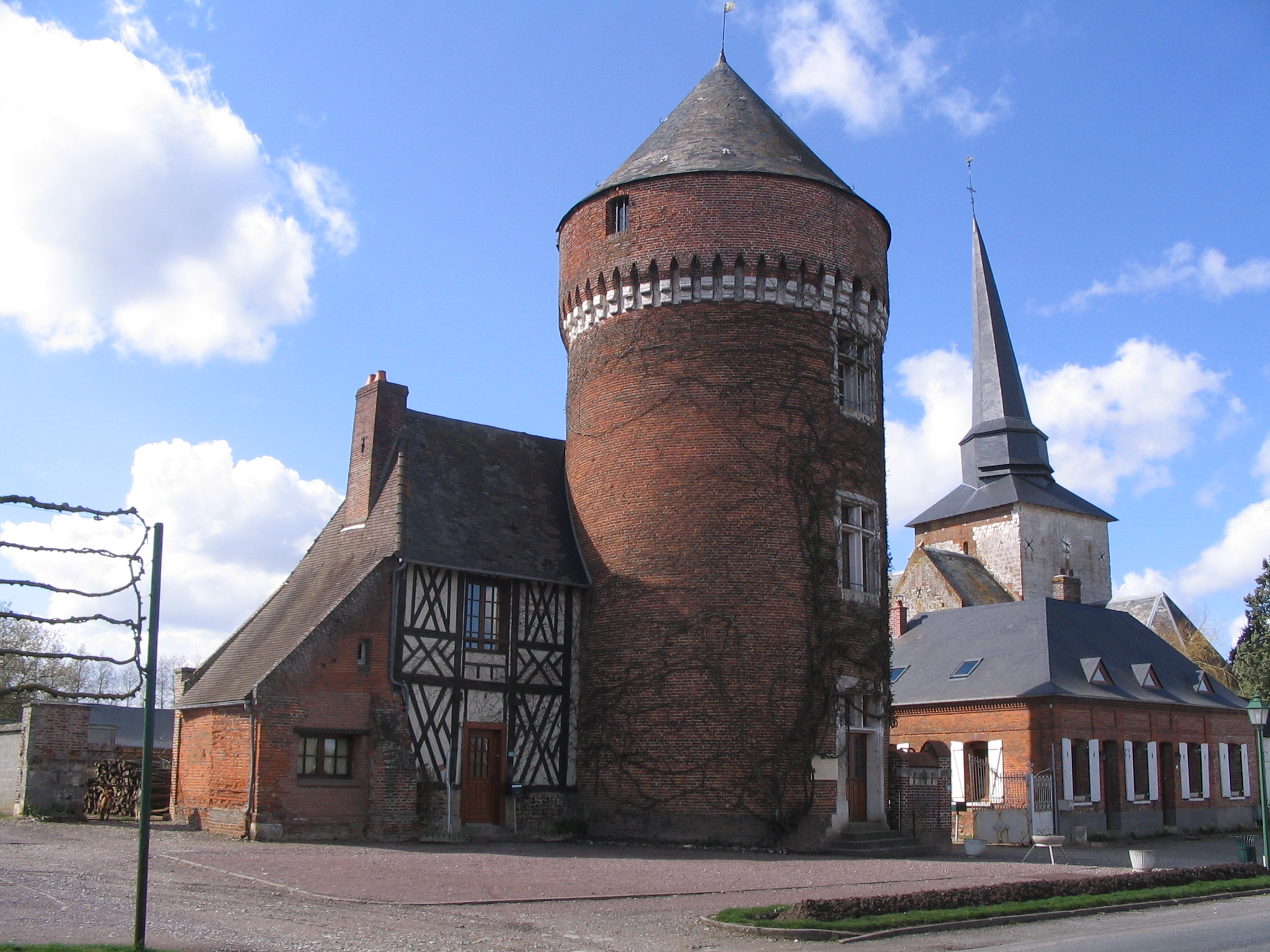
- The tower of the Duke of Mailly
- Location of Saint-Léger-aux-Bois
- Location within France Location within Normandy
- Coordinates: 49°50′04″N 1°36′42″E
- Country: France
- Region: Normandy
- Department: Seine-Maritime
- Arrondissement: Dieppe
- Canton: Eu
- Intercommunality: CC Aumale - Blangy-sur-Bresle

Government
  - Mayor (2020–2026): Rémy Ternisien
- Area^{1}: 11.02 km^{2} (4.25 sq mi)
- Elevation: 210 m (690 ft)
- Highest elevation: 221 m (725 ft)
- Lowest elevation: 153 m (502 ft)
- Population (2023): 474
  - Density: 43.0/km^{2} (111/sq mi)
- Time zone: UTC+01:00 (CET)
  - Summer (DST): UTC+02:00 (CEST)
- INSEE/Postal code: 76598 /76340
- ^{1} French Land Register data, which excludes lakes, ponds, glaciers > 1 km^{2} (0.386 sq mi or 247 acres) and river estuaries.

Saint-Léger-aux-Bois (French pronunciation: [sɛ̃ leʒe o bwa]) is a commune in the Seine-Maritime department in the Normandy region in northern France.

== Geography ==
A village of forestry, farming and associated light industry situated in the Pays de Bray, at the junction of the D920, the D7 and the D116 roads, some 25 miles (40 km) southeast of Dieppe.

== Population ==
Historical population
| Year | Pop. | ±% p.a. |
|---|---|---|
| 1968 | 502 | — |
| 1975 | 528 | +0.72% |
| 1982 | 512 | −0.44% |
| 1990 | 509 | −0.07% |
| 1999 | 455 | −1.24% |
| 2007 | 480 | +0.67% |
| 2012 | 522 | +1.69% |
| 2017 | 497 | −0.98% |
| 2023 | 474 | −0.79% |
Source: INSEE

== Places of interest ==
- The church of St.Leger, dating from the sixteenth century.
- A sixteenth century donjon, the ‘Tour de Mailly’, a 15m diameter round tower.

== See also ==
- Communes of the Seine-Maritime department
