= Bazinval =

- Commune
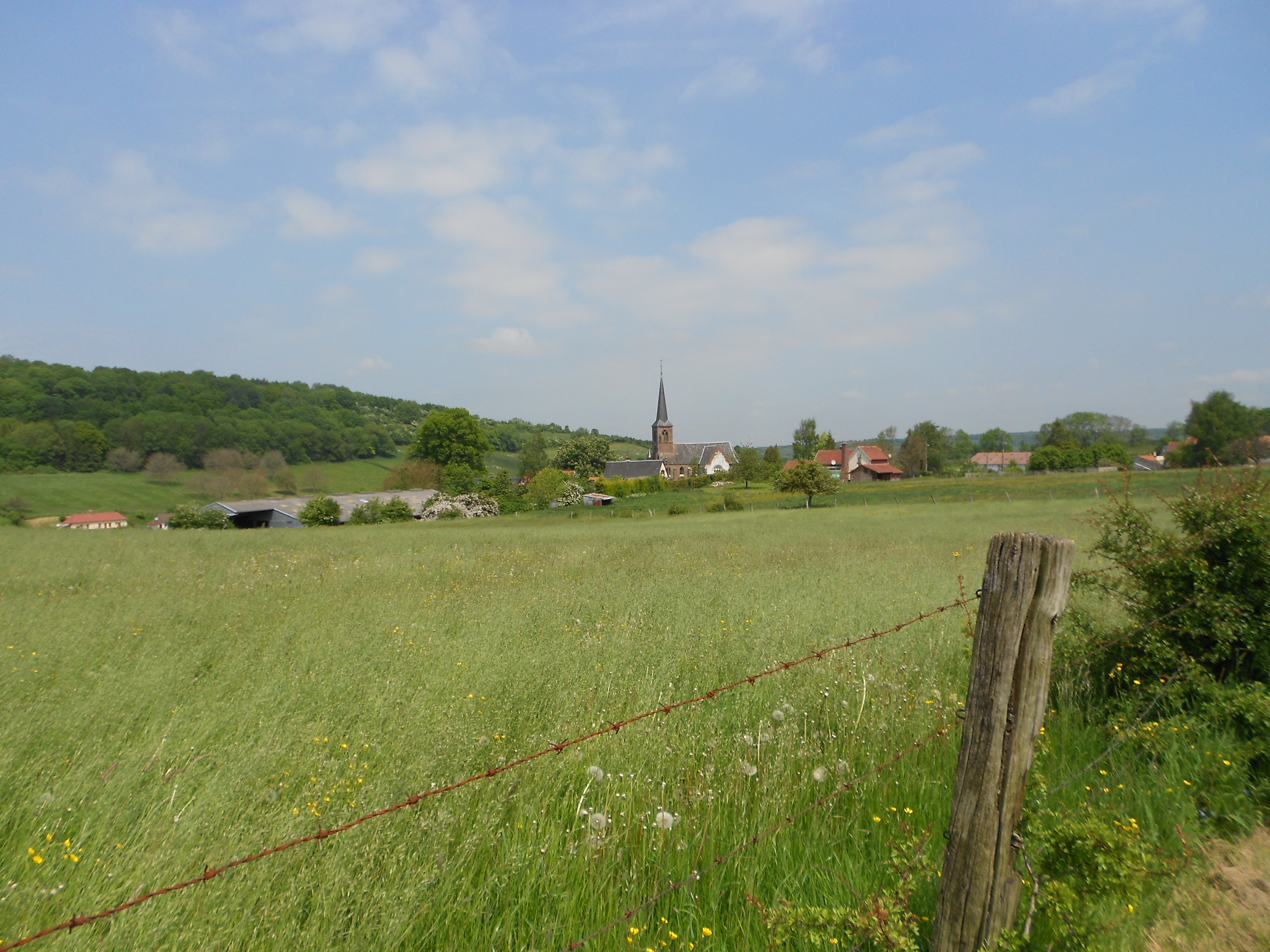
- A general view of Bazinval

- Coat of arms
- Location of Bazinval
- Location within France Location within Normandy
- Coordinates: 49°57′35″N 1°33′11″E
- Country: France
- Region: Normandy
- Department: Seine-Maritime
- Arrondissement: Dieppe
- Canton: Eu
- Intercommunality: CC Aumale - Blangy-sur-Bresle

Government
  - Mayor (2020–2026): Daniel Houzelle
- Area^{1}: 7.18 km^{2} (2.77 sq mi)
- Elevation: 88 m (289 ft)
- Highest elevation: 194 m (636 ft)
- Lowest elevation: 43 m (141 ft)
- Population (2023): 403
  - Density: 56.1/km^{2} (145/sq mi)
- Time zone: UTC+01:00 (CET)
  - Summer (DST): UTC+02:00 (CEST)
- INSEE/Postal code: 76059 /76340
- ^{1} French Land Register data, which excludes lakes, ponds, glaciers > 1 km^{2} (0.386 sq mi or 247 acres) and river estuaries.

Bazinval (French pronunciation: [bazɛ̃val]) is a commune in the Seine-Maritime department in the Normandy region in northern France.

== Geography ==
A forestry and farming village in the valley of the river Bresle and in the forest of Eu, situated some 25 miles (40 km) east of Dieppe, on the D115 road.

== Population ==
Historical population
Year	Pop.	±% p.a.
1968	285	—
1975	304	+0.93%
1982	330	+1.18%
1990	335	+0.19%
1999	299	−1.26%
2007	333	+1.36%
2012	383	+2.84%
2017	415	+1.62%
2023	403	−0.49%
Source: INSEE

== Places of interest ==
- The church of St.Martin, dating from the twelfth century.
- An eighteenth-century chapel.

== See also ==
- Communes of the Seine-Maritime department
