= Campneuseville =

- Commune
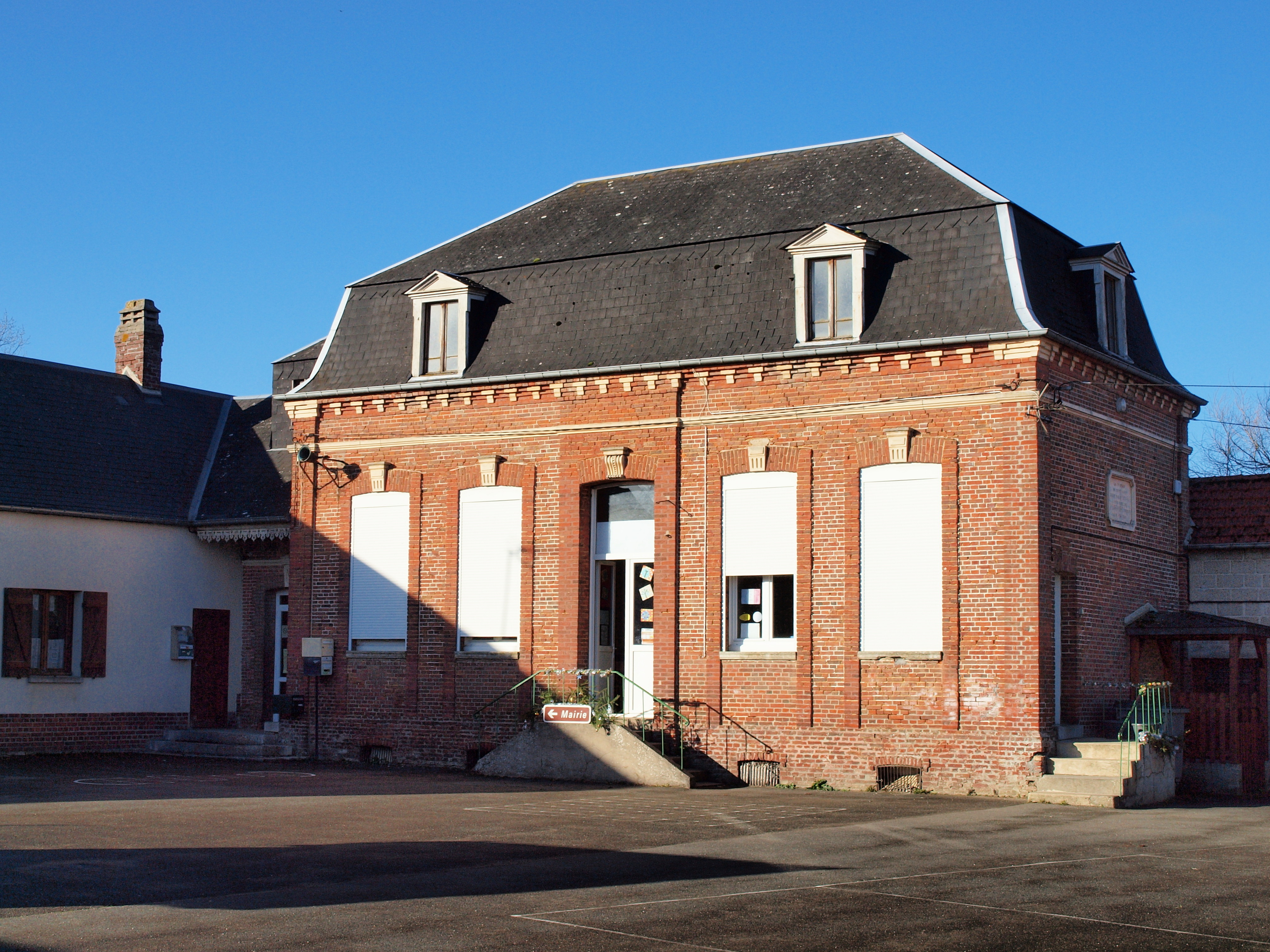
- The town hall in Campneuseville
- Location of Campneuseville
- Location within France Location within Normandy
- Coordinates: 49°51′32″N 1°39′32″E
- Country: France
- Region: Normandy
- Department: Seine-Maritime
- Arrondissement: Dieppe
- Canton: Eu
- Intercommunality: CC Aumale - Blangy-sur-Bresle

Government
  - Mayor (2026–32): Patrick Outrebon
- Area^{1}: 12.3 km^{2} (4.7 sq mi)
- Elevation: 209 m (686 ft)
- Highest elevation: 211 m (692 ft)
- Lowest elevation: 107 m (351 ft)
- Population (2023): 440
  - Density: 36/km^{2} (93/sq mi)
- Time zone: UTC+01:00 (CET)
  - Summer (DST): UTC+02:00 (CEST)
- INSEE/Postal code: 76154 /76340
- ^{1} French Land Register data, which excludes lakes, ponds, glaciers > 1 km^{2} (0.386 sq mi or 247 acres) and river estuaries.

Campneuseville is a commune in the Seine-Maritime department in the Normandy region in northern France.

== Geography ==
A forestry and farming village surrounded by woodland and situated in the Pays de Bray, some 29 miles (47 km) southeast of Dieppe, at the junction of the D216 with the D260 and D7 roads.

== Population ==
Historical population
Year	Pop.	±% p.a.
1968	595	—
1975	572	−0.56%
1982	552	−0.51%
1990	477	−1.81%
1999	485	+0.18%
2007	532	+1.16%
2012	484	−1.87%
2017	476	−0.33%
2023	440	−1.30%
Source: INSEE

== Places of interest ==
- The church of Notre-Dame, dating from the sixteenth century.
- A seventeenth century manorhouse.

== See also ==
- Communes of the Seine-Maritime department
- Monchy-le-Preux, a former commune that was joined to Campneuseville in 1823.
