= Saint-Martin-au-Bosc =

- Commune
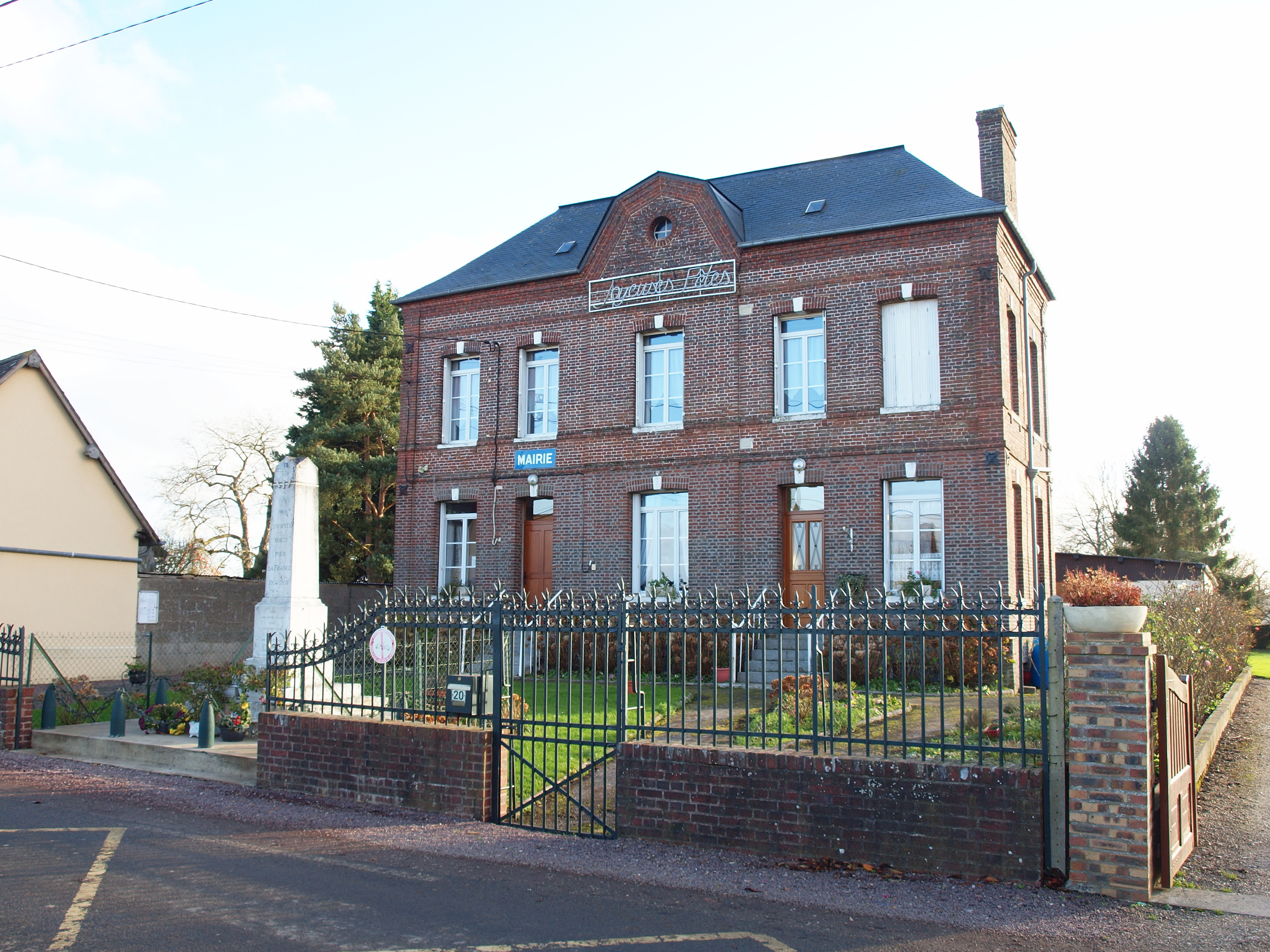
- The town hall in Saint-Martin-au-Bosc
- Location of Saint-Martin-au-Bosc
- Location within France Location within Normandy
- Coordinates: 49°49′57″N 1°39′42″E
- Country: France
- Region: Normandy
- Department: Seine-Maritime
- Arrondissement: Dieppe
- Canton: Eu
- Intercommunality: CC Aumale - Blangy-sur-Bresle

Government
  - Mayor (2026–32): Jérémy Eldert
- Area^{1}: 7.2 km^{2} (2.8 sq mi)
- Elevation: 200 m (660 ft)
- Highest elevation: 215 m (705 ft)
- Lowest elevation: 115 m (377 ft)
- Population (2023): 261
  - Density: 36/km^{2} (94/sq mi)
- Time zone: UTC+01:00 (CET)
  - Summer (DST): UTC+02:00 (CEST)
- INSEE/Postal code: 76612 /76340
- ^{1} French Land Register data, which excludes lakes, ponds, glaciers > 1 km^{2} (0.386 sq mi or 247 acres) and river estuaries.

Saint-Martin-au-Bosc is a commune in the Seine-Maritime department in the Normandy region in northern France.

== Geography ==
It is a small forestry and farming village situated in the Pays de Bray, on the D26 road, some 29 miles (47 km) southeast of Dieppe.

== Population ==
Historical population
Year	Pop.	±% p.a.
1968	225	—
1975	225	+0.00%
1982	184	−2.83%
1990	163	−1.50%
1999	173	+0.66%
2007	164	−0.67%
2012	204	+4.46%
2017	251	+4.23%
2023	261	+0.65%
Source: INSEE

== Places of interest ==
- The church of St. Martin, dating from the sixteenth century.

== See also ==
- Communes of the Seine-Maritime department
