= Rieux, Seine-Maritime =

Rieux
- Commune
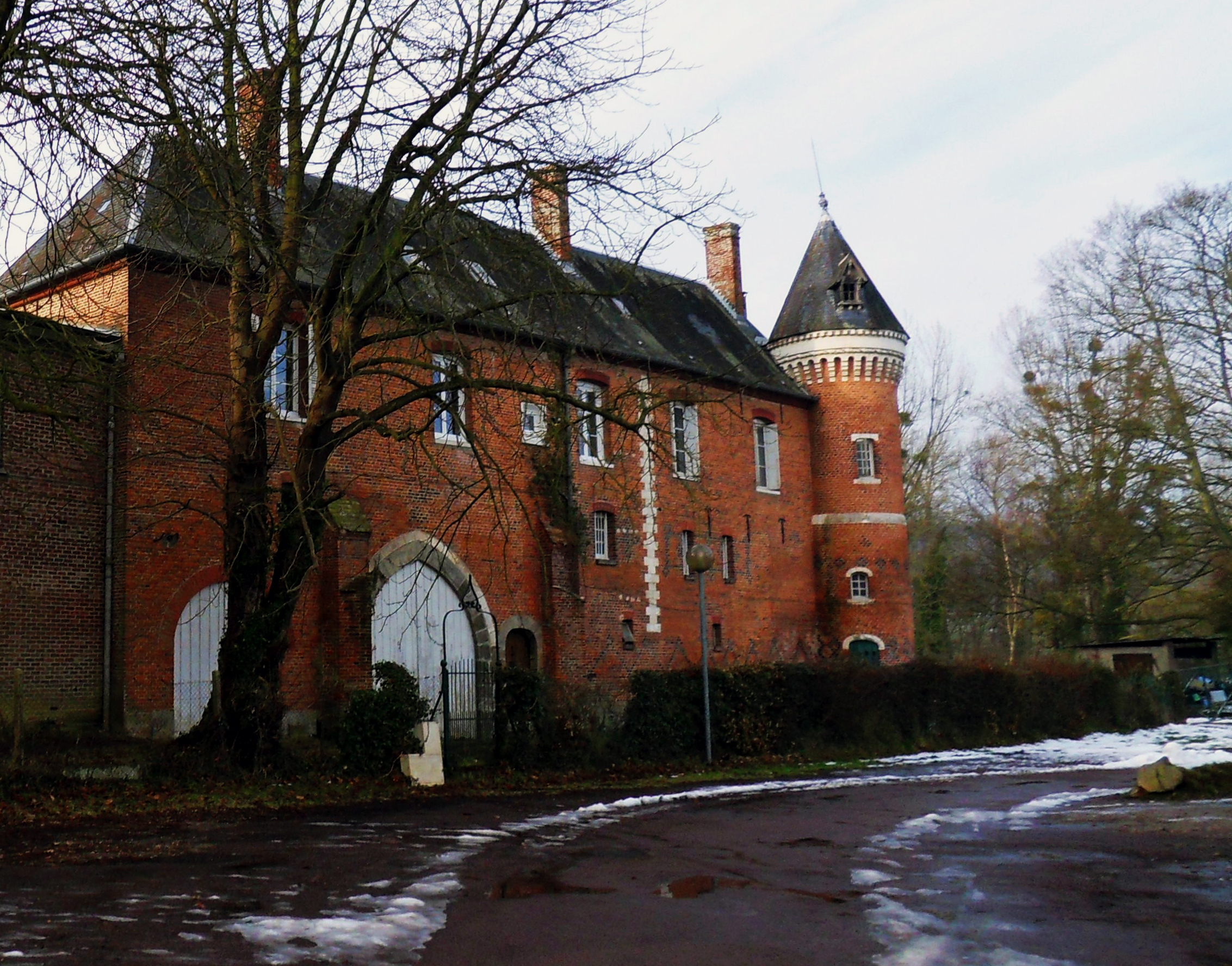
- The manor in Rieux

- Coat of arms
- Location of Rieux
- Location within France Location within Normandy
- Coordinates: 49°56′10″N 1°34′55″E
- Country: France
- Region: Normandy
- Department: Seine-Maritime
- Arrondissement: Dieppe
- Canton: Eu
- Intercommunality: CC Aumale - Blangy-sur-Bresle

Government
  - Mayor (2026–32): Christian Roussel
- Area^{1}: 7.09 km^{2} (2.74 sq mi)
- Elevation: 110 m (360 ft)
- Highest elevation: 209 m (686 ft)
- Lowest elevation: 61 m (200 ft)
- Population (2023): 583
  - Density: 82.2/km^{2} (213/sq mi)
- Time zone: UTC+01:00 (CET)
  - Summer (DST): UTC+02:00 (CEST)
- INSEE/Postal code: 76528 /76340
- ^{1} French Land Register data, which excludes lakes, ponds, glaciers > 1 km^{2} (0.386 sq mi or 247 acres) and river estuaries.

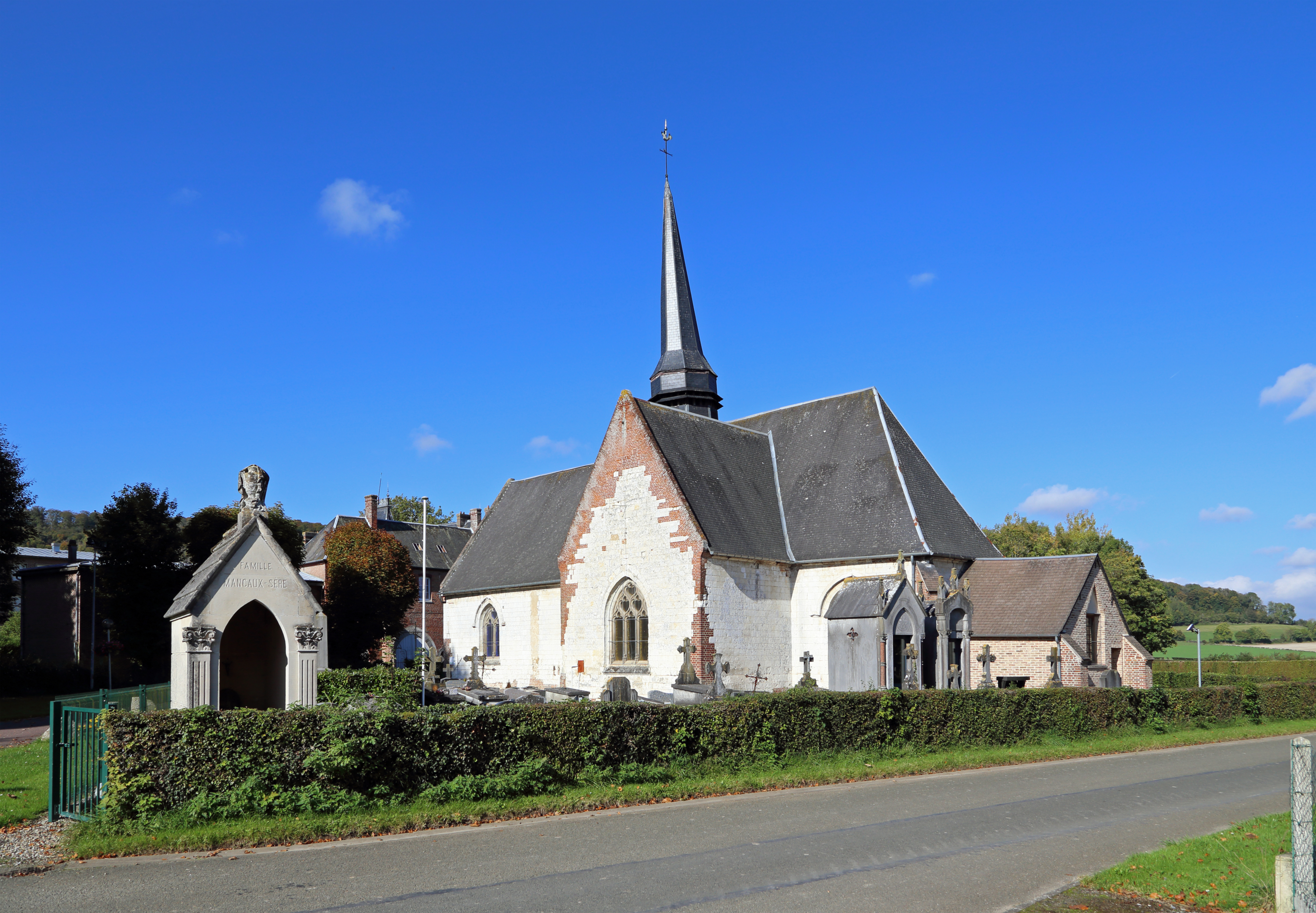
St Martin and Bartholomeus church in Rieux

Rieux (French pronunciation: [ʁijø]) is a commune in the Seine-Maritime department in the Normandy region in northern France.

== Geography ==
A forestry and farming village situated in the Pays de Bray at the junction of the D149 with the D407 road, some 22 miles (35 km) east of Dieppe.

== Heraldry ==
Arms of Rieux	The arms of Rieux are blazoned : Or, on a fess wavy azure between a demi-lion issuant from the fess and, in fess a rose between 2 mallets gules, a sword [fesswise] argent.

== Population ==
Historical population
Year	Pop.	±% p.a.
1968	407	—
1975	415	+0.28%
1982	417	+0.07%
1990	475	+1.64%
1999	576	+2.17%
2007	618	+0.88%
2012	639	+0.67%
2017	632	−0.22%
2023	583	−1.34%
Source: INSEE

== Places of interest ==
- The church of St. Martin & St. Barthélemy, dating from the sixteenth century.
- A fifteenth century brick-built manorhouse.

== See also ==
- Communes of the Seine-Maritime department
- Rio (disambiguation)
- Ríos (disambiguation)
