= Rétonval =

- Commune
- Location of Rétonval
- Location within France Location within Normandy
- Coordinates: 49°49′15″N 1°35′39″E
- Country: France
- Region: Normandy
- Department: Seine-Maritime
- Arrondissement: Dieppe
- Canton: Eu
- Intercommunality: CC Aumale - Blangy-sur-Bresle

Government
  - Mayor (2020–2026): Delphine Covin
- Area^{1}: 5.62 km^{2} (2.17 sq mi)
- Elevation: 149 m (489 ft)
- Highest elevation: 221 m (725 ft)
- Lowest elevation: 140 m (460 ft)
- Population (2023): 172
  - Density: 30.6/km^{2} (79.3/sq mi)
- Time zone: UTC+01:00 (CET)
  - Summer (DST): UTC+02:00 (CEST)
- INSEE/Postal code: 76523 /76340
- ^{1} French Land Register data, which excludes lakes, ponds, glaciers > 1 km^{2} (0.386 sq mi or 247 acres) and river estuaries.

Rétonval (French pronunciation: [ʁetɔ̃val]) is a commune in the Seine-Maritime department in the Normandy region in northern France.

== Geography ==
A small village of forestry and farming situated in the Pays de Bray at the junction of the D116 and the D82 roads, some 23 miles (37 km) southeast of Dieppe.

== Population ==
Historical population
Year	Pop.	±% p.a.
1968	298	—
1975	247	−2.65%
1982	257	+0.57%
1990	212	−2.38%
1999	190	−1.21%
2007	193	+0.20%
2012	197	+0.41%
2017	195	−0.20%
2023	172	−2.07%
Source: INSEE

== Places of interest ==
- The church of St. Laurent, dating from the sixteenth century.

== See also ==
- Communes of the Seine-Maritime department
