= Nesle-Normandeuse =

- Commune
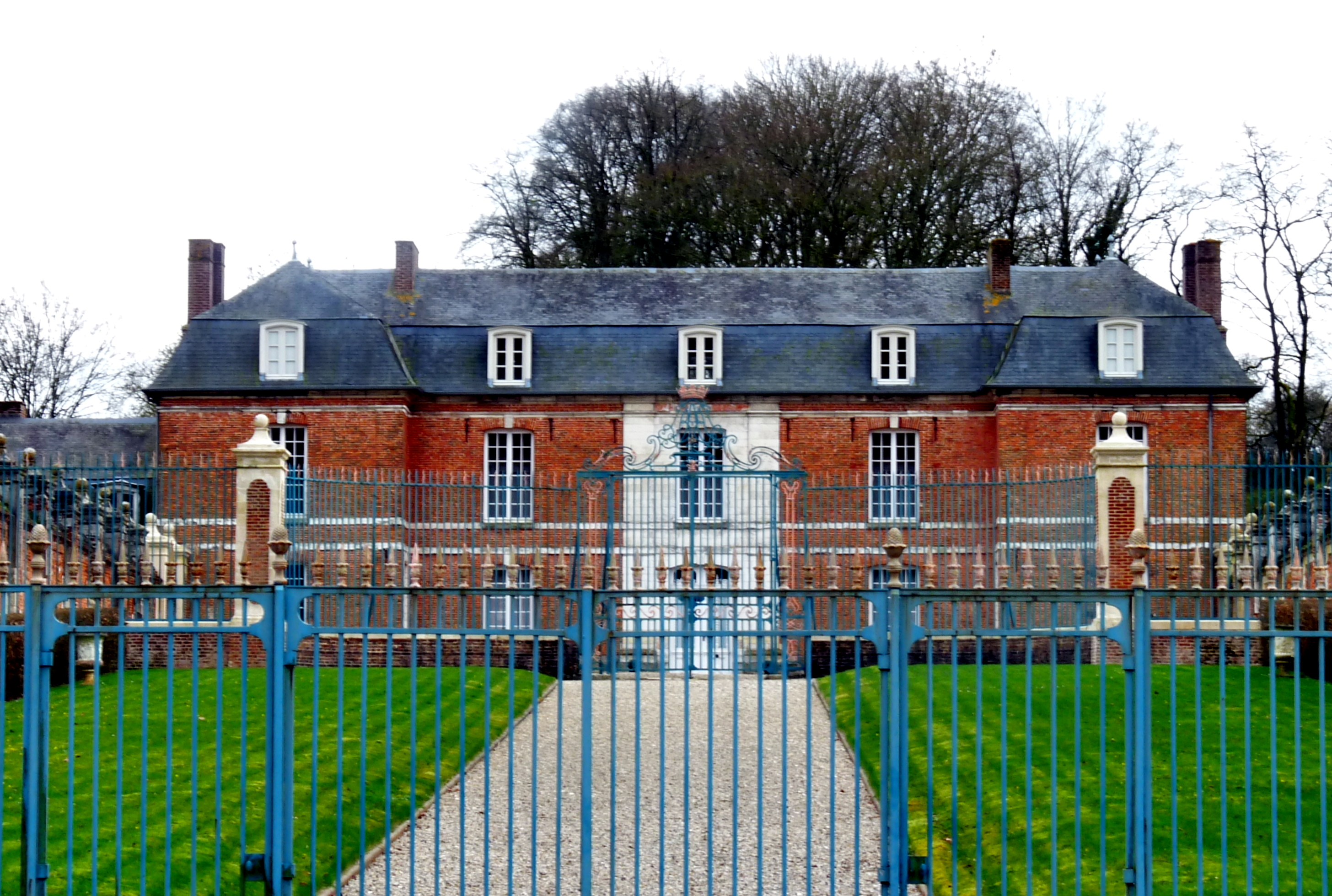
- The chateau of Romesnil in Nesle-Normandeuse
- Location of Nesle-Normandeuse
- Location within France Location within Normandy
- Coordinates: 49°54′31″N 1°40′14″E
- Country: France
- Region: Normandy
- Department: Seine-Maritime
- Arrondissement: Dieppe
- Canton: Eu
- Intercommunality: CC Aumale - Blangy-sur-Bresle

Government
  - Mayor (2026–32): Agnès Crept
- Area^{1}: 9.1 km^{2} (3.5 sq mi)
- Elevation: 64 m (210 ft)
- Highest elevation: 204 m (669 ft)
- Lowest elevation: 53 m (174 ft)
- Population (2023): 503
  - Density: 55/km^{2} (140/sq mi)
- Time zone: UTC+01:00 (CET)
  - Summer (DST): UTC+02:00 (CEST)
- INSEE/Postal code: 76460 /76340
- ^{1} French Land Register data, which excludes lakes, ponds, glaciers > 1 km^{2} (0.386 sq mi or 247 acres) and river estuaries.

Nesle-Normandeuse (French pronunciation: [nɛl nɔʁmɑ̃døz]) is a commune in the Seine-Maritime department in the Normandy region in northern France.

== Geography ==
A village of farming and light industry situated in the valley of the river Bresle in the Pays de Bray, some 25 miles (40 km) east of Dieppe at the junction of the D49, the D116 and the D260.

== Population ==
Historical population
Year	Pop.	±% p.a.
1968	707	—
1975	684	−0.47%
1982	606	−1.71%
1990	610	+0.08%
1999	576	−0.64%
2007	589	+0.28%
2012	593	+0.14%
2017	546	−1.64%
2023	503	−1.36%
Source: INSEE

== Places of interest ==
- The glassworks factory, one of the last remaining in the region.
- The church of St. Lambert, dating from the seventeenth century.
- The eighteenth century chateau built for Louis Auguste de Bourbon, grandson of Louis XV.

== See also ==
- Communes of the Seine-Maritime department
