= Dancourt, Seine-Maritime =

Dancourt
- Commune
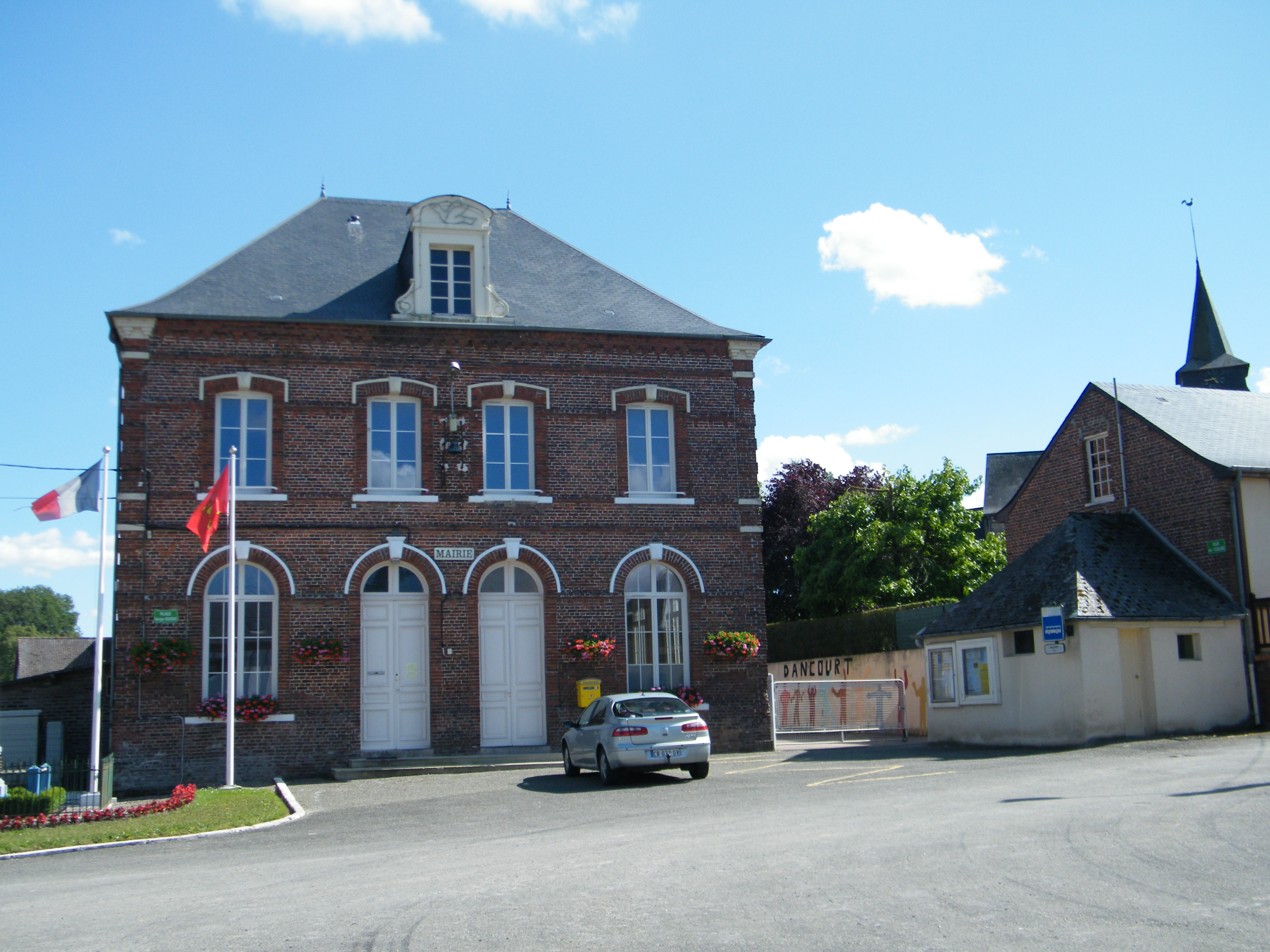
- The town hall in Dancourt

- Coat of arms
- Location of Dancourt
- Location within France Location within Normandy
- Coordinates: 49°53′38″N 1°32′47″E
- Country: France
- Region: Normandy
- Department: Seine-Maritime
- Arrondissement: Dieppe
- Canton: Eu
- Intercommunality: CC Aumale - Blangy-sur-Bresle

Government
  - Mayor (2026–32): Jean-Luc Morel
- Area^{1}: 18.3 km^{2} (7.1 sq mi)
- Elevation: 90 m (300 ft)
- Highest elevation: 209 m (686 ft)
- Lowest elevation: 74 m (243 ft)
- Population (2023): 235
  - Density: 12.8/km^{2} (33.3/sq mi)
- Time zone: UTC+01:00 (CET)
  - Summer (DST): UTC+02:00 (CEST)
- INSEE/Postal code: 76211 /76340
- ^{1} French Land Register data, which excludes lakes, ponds, glaciers > 1 km^{2} (0.386 sq mi or 247 acres) and river estuaries.

Dancourt (French pronunciation: [dɑ̃kuʁ]) is a commune in the Seine-Maritime department in the Normandy region in northern France.

== Geography ==
A farming village situated by the banks of the river Yères in the Pays de Bray, some 22 miles (35 km) east of Dieppe, at the junction of the D16 and the D214 roads.

== Heraldry ==
Arms of Dancourt	The arms of Dancourt are blazoned : Azure, on a bend between 2 crescents argent, 3 torteaux (gules).

== Population ==
Historical population
Year	Pop.	±% p.a.
1968	307	—
1975	276	−1.51%
1982	307	+1.53%
1990	266	−1.78%
1999	264	−0.08%
2007	236	−1.39%
2012	229	−0.60%
2017	229	+0.00%
2023	235	+0.43%
Source: INSEE

== Places of interest ==
- A fifteenth-century stone cross.
- The church of St. Aubin, dating from the eighteenth century.
- The chapel of Notre-Dame, at Béthencourt.

== See also ==
- Communes of the Seine-Maritime department
