= Saint-Riquier-en-Rivière =

- Commune
- Coat of arms
- Location of Saint-Riquier-en-Rivière
- Location within France Location within Normandy
- Coordinates: 49°53′28″N 1°33′38″E
- Country: France
- Region: Normandy
- Department: Seine-Maritime
- Arrondissement: Dieppe
- Canton: Eu
- Intercommunality: CC Aumale - Blangy-sur-Bresle

Government
  - Mayor (2026–32): Ludovic Julien
- Area^{1}: 9.99 km^{2} (3.86 sq mi)
- Elevation: 95 m (312 ft)
- Highest elevation: 216 m (709 ft)
- Lowest elevation: 87 m (285 ft)
- Population (2023): 159
  - Density: 15.9/km^{2} (41.2/sq mi)
- Time zone: UTC+01:00 (CET)
  - Summer (DST): UTC+02:00 (CEST)
- INSEE/Postal code: 76645 /76340
- ^{1} French Land Register data, which excludes lakes, ponds, glaciers > 1 km^{2} (0.386 sq mi or 247 acres) and river estuaries.

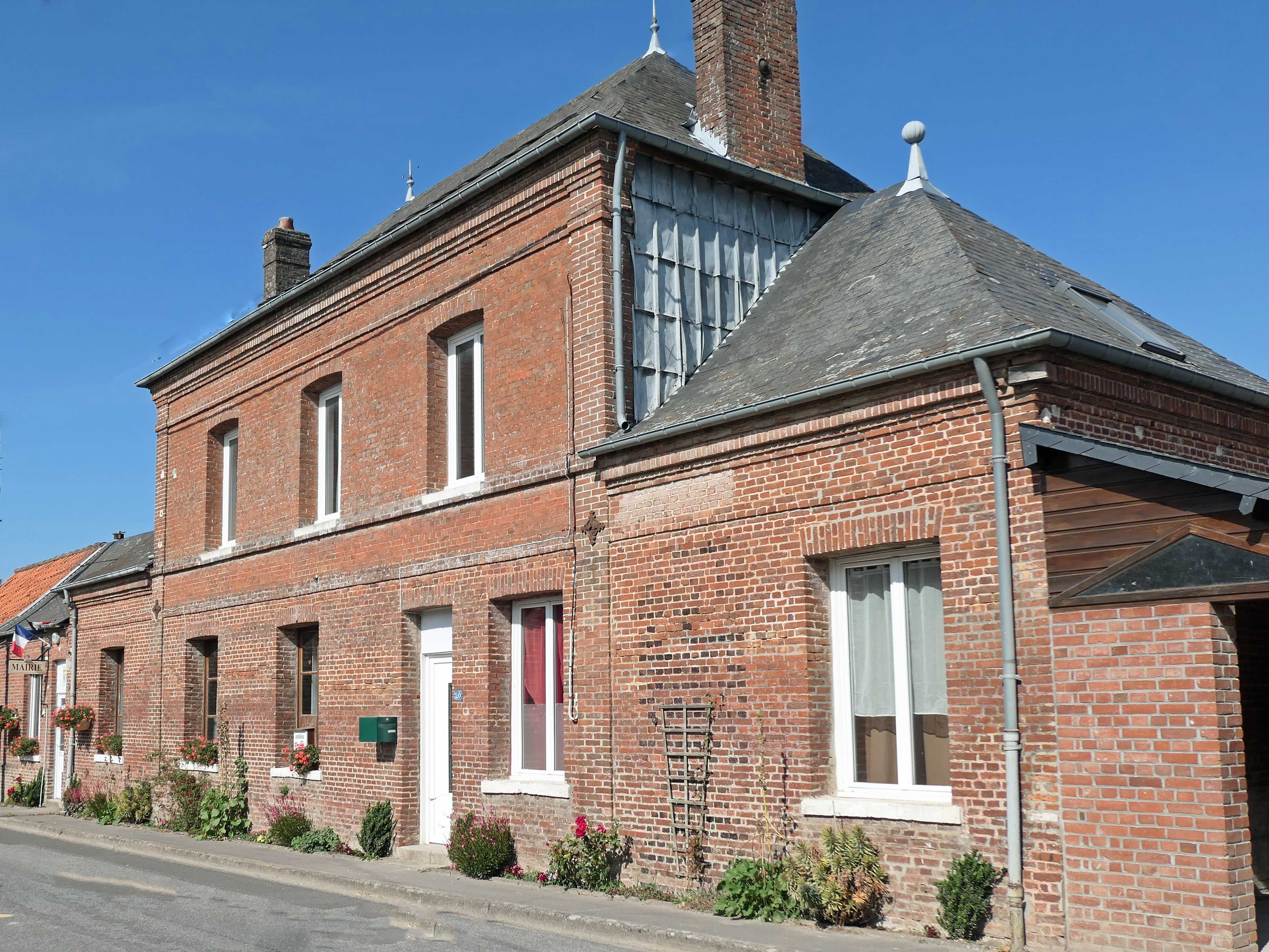
SAINT RIQUIER EN RIVIERE

Saint-Riquier-en-Rivière is a commune in the Seine-Maritime department in the Normandy region in northern France.

== Geography ==
A small forestry and farming village located along the banks of the Yères river in the Pays de Bray, approximately 19 miles (31 km) east of Dieppe. The villages lies at the junction of the D16 and the D127 roads, with the A28 autoroute passing through the southern part of the commune.

== Heraldry ==
Arms of Saint-Riquier-en-Rivière	The arms of Saint-Riquier-en-Rivière are blazoned : Or, a bend azure between a tree eradicated vert and a mallet gules, a rose between 2 escallops all palewise argent.

== Population ==
Historical population
Year	Pop.	±% p.a.
1968	189	—
1975	179	−0.77%
1982	168	−0.90%
1990	140	−2.25%
1999	135	−0.40%
2007	159	+2.07%
2012	160	+0.13%
2017	148	−1.55%
2023	159	+1.20%
Source: INSEE

== Places of interest ==
- The church of St. Riquier, dating from the eleventh century.

== See also ==
- Communes of the Seine-Maritime department
