= Foucarmont =

- Commune
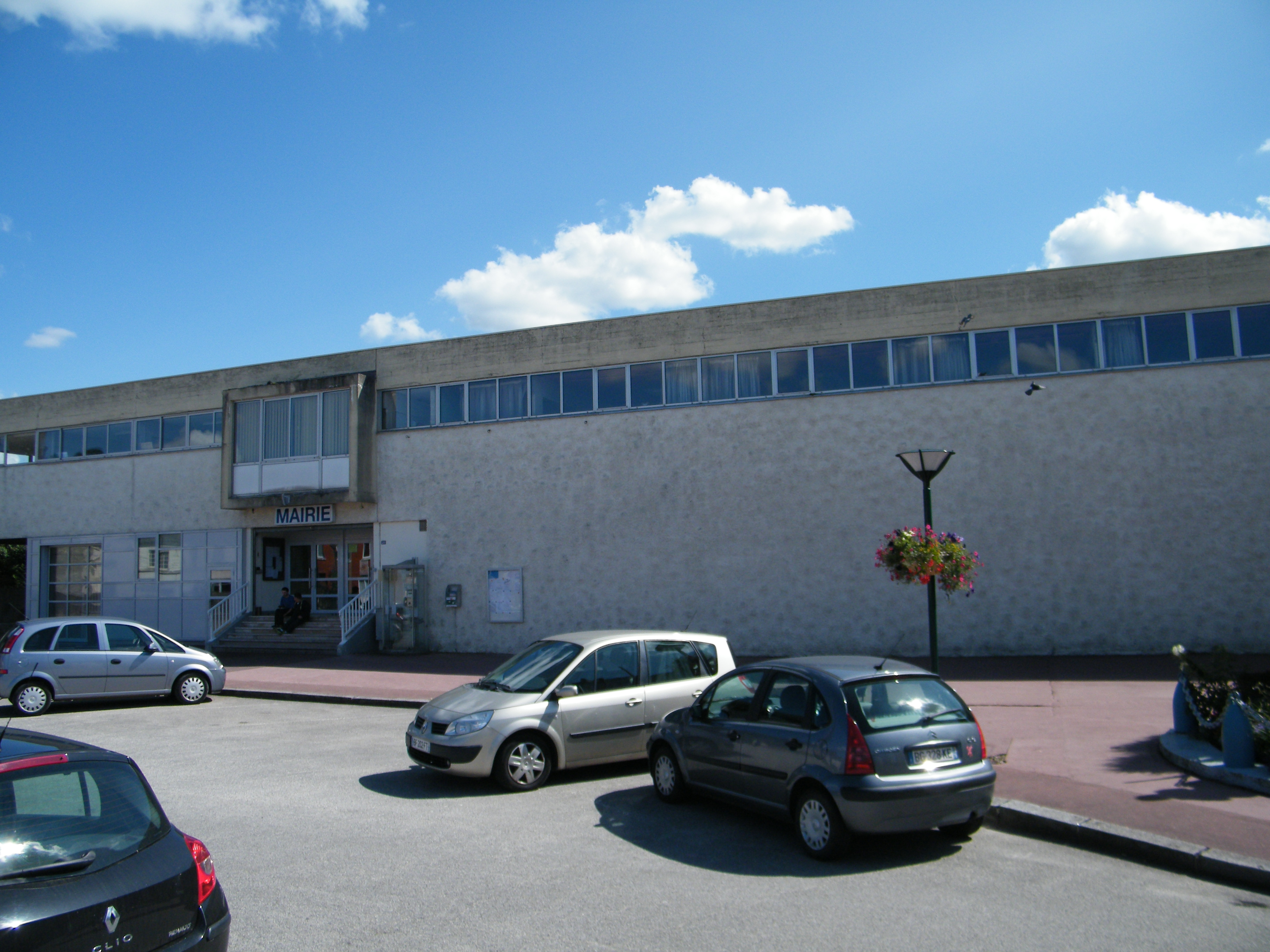
- The town hall in Foucarmont
- Location of Foucarmont
- Location within France Location within Normandy
- Coordinates: 49°50′51″N 1°34′10″E
- Country: France
- Region: Normandy
- Department: Seine-Maritime
- Arrondissement: Dieppe
- Canton: Eu
- Intercommunality: CC Aumale - Blangy-sur-Bresle

Government
  - Mayor (2020–2026): Dominique Vallee
- Area^{1}: 7.28 km^{2} (2.81 sq mi)
- Elevation: 122 m (400 ft)
- Highest elevation: 203 m (666 ft)
- Lowest elevation: 103 m (338 ft)
- Population (2023): 816
  - Density: 112/km^{2} (290/sq mi)
- Time zone: UTC+01:00 (CET)
  - Summer (DST): UTC+02:00 (CEST)
- INSEE/Postal code: 76278 /76340
- ^{1} French Land Register data, which excludes lakes, ponds, glaciers > 1 km^{2} (0.386 sq mi or 247 acres) and river estuaries.

Foucarmont (French pronunciation: [fukaʁmɔ̃]) is a commune in the Seine-Maritime department in the Normandy region in northern France.

== Geography ==
A large village of farming and associated light industry, situated by the banks of the river Yères, in the Pays de Bray, some 20 miles (32 km) southeast of Dieppe, at the junction of the D928, the D16 and the D920 roads. The A28 autoroute passes within the borders of the commune.

== Population ==
Historical population
Year	Pop.	±% p.a.
1968	955	—
1975	926	−0.44%
1982	954	+0.43%
1990	993	+0.50%
1999	1,045	+0.57%
2007	1,017	−0.34%
2012	907	−2.26%
2017	817	−2.07%
2023	816	−0.02%
Source: INSEE

== Places of interest ==
- The twentieth century church of St.Martin.
- The remains of a 12th-century abbey.

== See also ==
- Communes of the Seine-Maritime department
