= Blangy-sur-Bresle =

- Commune
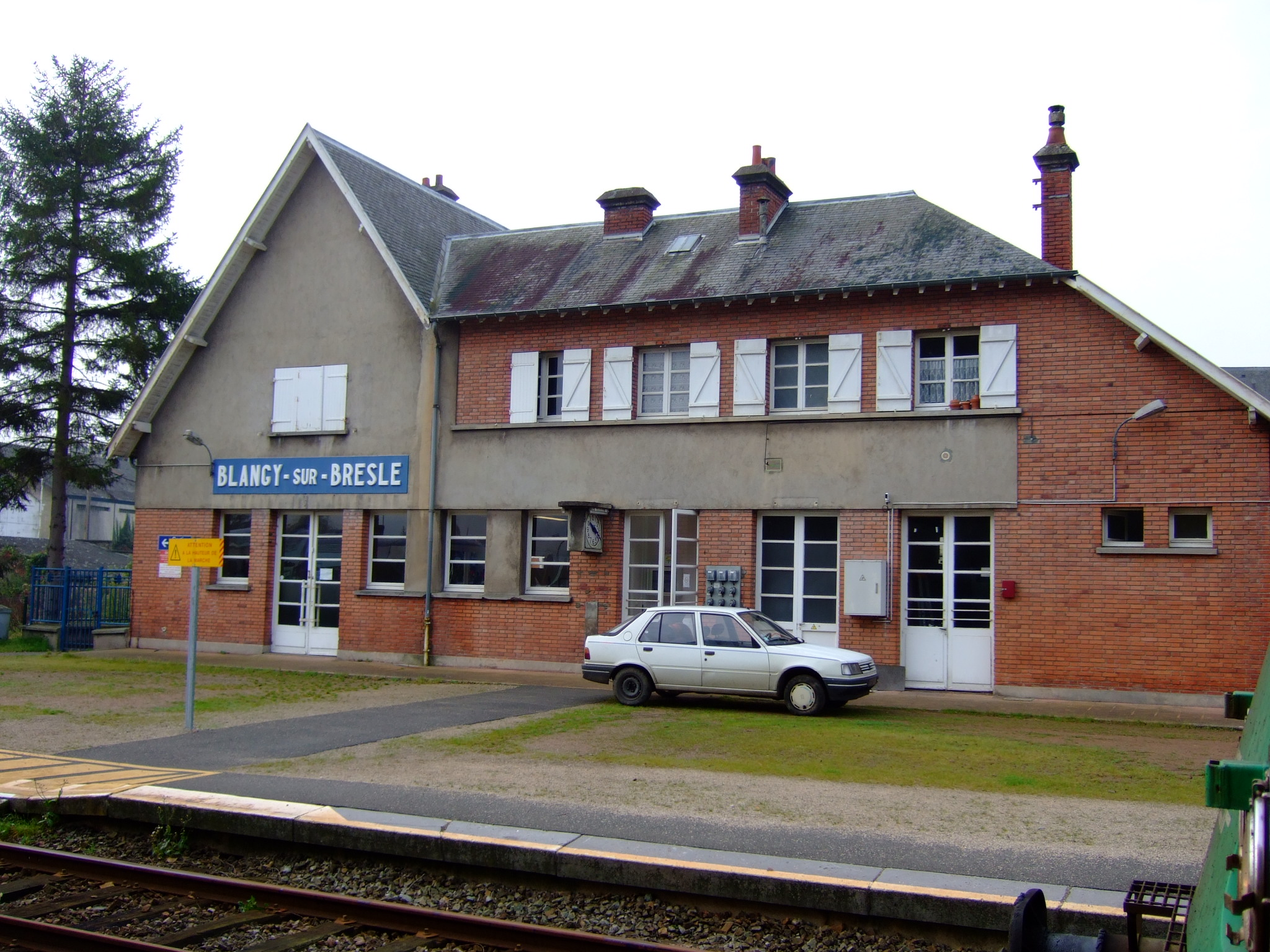
- Blangy railway station

- Coat of arms
- Location of Blangy-sur-Bresle
- Location within France Location within Normandy
- Coordinates: 49°55′57″N 1°37′46″E
- Country: France
- Region: Normandy
- Department: Seine-Maritime
- Arrondissement: Dieppe
- Canton: Eu
- Intercommunality: CC Aumale - Blangy-sur-Bresle

Government
  - Mayor (2020–2026): Éric Arnoux
- Area^{1}: 17.45 km^{2} (6.74 sq mi)
- Elevation: 49 m (161 ft)
- Highest elevation: 216 m (709 ft)
- Lowest elevation: 42 m (138 ft)
- Population (2023): 2,819
  - Density: 161.5/km^{2} (418.4/sq mi)
- Time zone: UTC+01:00 (CET)
  - Summer (DST): UTC+02:00 (CEST)
- INSEE/Postal code: 76101 /76340
- ^{1} French Land Register data, which excludes lakes, ponds, glaciers > 1 km^{2} (0.386 sq mi or 247 acres) and river estuaries.

Blangy-sur-Bresle (French pronunciation: [blɑ̃ʒi syʁ bʁɛl], literally Blangy on Bresle, before 1962: Blangy) is a commune in the department of Seine-Maritime in the Normandy region of northern France.

== Geography ==
Blangy is a small town situated in the valley of the river Bresle – which here forms the border between Normandy and Picardy – some 40 kilometres (25 mi) east of Dieppe in the Pays de Bray. Forestry, farming, and light industry are the main economic activities. The town lies on the D49 and the D928 roads close to junction 5 of the A29 motorway. Blangy-sur-Bresle station has rail connections to Beauvais and Le Tréport.

== Heraldry ==
Arms of Blangy-sur-Bresle	The arms of Blangy-sur-Bresle are blazoned : Argent, a lion sable, armed and langued gules.

== Population ==
Historical population
Year	Pop.	±% p.a.
1968	3,336	—
1975	3,404	+0.29%
1982	3,456	+0.22%
1990	3,447	−0.03%
1999	3,405	−0.14%
2007	3,146	−0.98%
2012	2,939	−1.35%
2017	2,972	+0.22%
2023	2,819	−0.88%
Source: INSEE

== Places of interest ==
- The church of Notre-Dame, dating from the thirteenth century.
- The Manoir de Fontaine (1607).
- The Manoir de Penthièvre (1636), built for la Grande Mademoiselle.
- The seventeenth century fulling mill at Hollande
- The Manoir de Grémontmesnil (1776).
- The mill at Hottineaux 1800).
- The remains of a medieval castle.
- Three museums.

== Notable people ==
- Anne Marie Louise of Orléans (1627–1693), la Grande Mademoiselle.

== See also ==
- Communes of the Seine-Maritime department
