= Canton of Longueville-sur-Scie =

Coordinates: 49°47′44″N 1°07′13″E

Longueville-sur-Scie
- Former canton
- Interactive map of Longueville-sur-Scie
- Country: France
- Region: Normandy
- Department: Seine-Maritime
- No. of communes: {{{nbcomm}}}
- Disbanded: 2015
- Area: 123.43 km^{2} (47.66 sq mi)
- Population (2012): 8,022
  - Density: 64.99/km^{2} (168.3/sq mi)

The Canton of Longueville-sur-Scie is a former canton situated in the Seine-Maritime département and in the Haute-Normandie region of northern France. It was disbanded following the French canton reorganisation which came into effect in March 2015. It consisted of 23 communes, which joined the canton of Luneray in 2015. It had a total of 8,022 inhabitants (2012).

== Geography ==
An area of farming and associated light industry in the arrondissement of Dieppe, centred on the town of Longueville-sur-Scie. The altitude varies from 14m (Saint-Germain-d'Étables) to 176m (Muchedent) for an average altitude of 87m.

The canton comprised 23 communes:

- Anneville-sur-Scie
- Belmesnil
- Bertreville-Saint-Ouen
- Le Bois-Robert
- Le Catelier
- Les Cent-Acres
- La Chapelle-du-Bourgay
- La Chaussée
- Criquetot-sur-Longueville
- Crosville-sur-Scie
- Dénestanville
- Heugleville-sur-Scie
- Lintot-les-Bois
- Longueville-sur-Scie
- Manéhouville
- Muchedent
- Notre-Dame-du-Parc
- Saint-Crespin
- Saint-Germain-d'Étables
- Saint-Honoré
- Sainte-Foy
- Torcy-le-Grand
- Torcy-le-Petit

== Population ==
Historical population Canton of Longueville-sur-Scie
| Year | 1962 | 1968 | 1975 | 1982 | 1990 | 1999 |
| Pop. | 5,682 | 6,149 | 6,046 | 6,684 | 7,080 | 7,091 |
| ±% | — | +8.2% | −1.7% | +10.6% | +5.9% | +0.2% |
From the year 1962 on: No double counting – residents of multiple communes (e.g. students and military personnel) are counted only once. Source: INSEE

== See also ==
- Arrondissements of the Seine-Maritime department
- Cantons of the Seine-Maritime department
- Communes of the Seine-Maritime department
