= Communauté de communes de Varenne et Scie =

Coordinates: 49.7823°N 1.1569°E

Varenne et Scie
- Former communauté de communes
- Interactive map of Varenne et Scie
- Country: France
- Region: Normandy
- Department: Seine-Maritime
- No. of communes: {{{nbcomm}}}
- Established: January 1, 2002
- Disbanded: 2017
- Area: 110.34 km^{2} (42.60 sq mi)
- Population (1999): 6,547
  - Density: 59.33/km^{2} (153.7/sq mi)

The Communauté de communes de Varenne et Scie is a former intercommunality in the Seine-Maritime département of the Normandy region of north-western France. It was created on January 1, 2002. It was merged into the new Communauté de communes Terroir de Caux in January 2017.

== Participants ==
The Communauté de communes comprised the following 22 communes:

- Anneville-sur-Scie
- Belmesnil
- Le Bois-Robert
- Bertreville-Saint-Ouen
- Le Catelier
- Les Cent-Acres
- La Chapelle-du-Bourgay
- La Chaussée
- Criquetot-sur-Longueville
- Crosville-sur-Scie
- Dénestanville
- Lintot-les-Bois
- Longueville-sur-Scie
- Manéhouville
- Muchedent
- Notre-Dame-du-Parc
- Saint-Crespin
- Saint-Germain-d'Étables
- Saint-Honoré
- Sainte-Foy
- Torcy-le-Grand
- Torcy-le-Petit

== See also ==
- Communes of the Seine-Maritime department
