= Communauté de communes des Trois Rivières, Seine-Maritime =

Coordinates: 49.6793°N 1.0455°E

Trois Rivières
- Former communauté de communes
- Interactive map of Trois Rivières
- Country: France
- Region: Normandy
- Department: Seine-Maritime
- No. of communes: {{{nbcomm}}}
- Established: 1 January 2002
- Disbanded: 2017
- Area: 190.16 km^{2} (73.42 sq mi)
- Population (1999): 11,819
  - Density: 62.153/km^{2} (160.98/sq mi)

The Communauté de communes des Trois Rivières is a former intercommunality in the Seine-Maritime département of the Normandy region of north-western France. It was created in January 2002. It was merged into the new Communauté de communes Terroir de Caux in January 2017.

== Participants ==
The Communauté de communes comprised the following 25 communes:

- Auffay
- Beauval-en-Caux
- Belleville-en-Caux
- Bertrimont
- Biville-la-Baignarde
- Calleville-les-Deux-Églises
- Étaimpuis
- La Fontelaye
- Fresnay-le-Long
- Gonneville-sur-Scie
- Heugleville-sur-Scie
- Imbleville
- Montreuil-en-Caux
- Saint-Denis-sur-Scie
- Saint-Maclou-de-Folleville
- Saint-Ouen-du-Breuil
- Saint-Vaast-du-Val
- Saint-Victor-l'Abbaye
- Sévis
- Tôtes
- Val-de-Saâne
- Varneville-Bretteville
- Vassonville

== See also ==
- Communes of the Seine-Maritime department
