= Canton of Tôtes =

Coordinates: 49°41′42″N 1°03′11″E

Tôtes
- Former canton
- Interactive map of Tôtes
- Country: France
- Region: Normandy
- Department: Seine-Maritime
- No. of communes: {{{nbcomm}}}
- Disbanded: 2015
- Area: 181.23 km^{2} (69.97 sq mi)
- Population (2012): 13,342
  - Density: 73.619/km^{2} (190.67/sq mi)

The Canton of Tôtes is a former canton situated in the Seine-Maritime département and in the Haute-Normandie region of northern France. It was disbanded following the French canton reorganisation which came into effect in March 2015. It had a total of 13,342 inhabitants (2012).

== Geography ==
An area of farming and associated light industry in the arrondissement of Dieppe, centred on the village of Tôtes. The altitude varies from 69m (Saint-Pierre-Bénouville) to 176m (Fresnay-le-Long) for an average altitude of 134m.

The canton comprised 22 communes:

- Auffay
- Beauval-en-Caux
- Belleville-en-Caux
- Bertrimont
- Biville-la-Baignarde
- Bracquetuit
- Calleville-les-Deux-Églises
- Étaimpuis
- La Fontelaye
- Fresnay-le-Long
- Gonneville-sur-Scie
- Imbleville
- Montreuil-en-Caux
- Saint-Denis-sur-Scie
- Saint-Maclou-de-Folleville
- Saint-Pierre-Bénouville
- Saint-Vaast-du-Val
- Saint-Victor-l'Abbaye
- Tôtes
- Val-de-Saâne
- Varneville-Bretteville
- Vassonville

== Population ==
Historical population Canton of Tôtes
Year	1962	1968	1975	1982	1990	1999
Pop.	8,509	8,982	9,294	10,113	10,618	10,937
±%	—	+5.6%	+3.5%	+8.8%	+5.0%	+3.0%
From the year 1962 on: No double counting – residents of multiple communes (e.g. students and military personnel) are counted only once. Source: INSEE

== See also ==
- Arrondissements of the Seine-Maritime department
- Cantons of the Seine-Maritime department
- Communes of the Seine-Maritime department
