= Charles de Médine =

French Navy officer of the War of American Independence

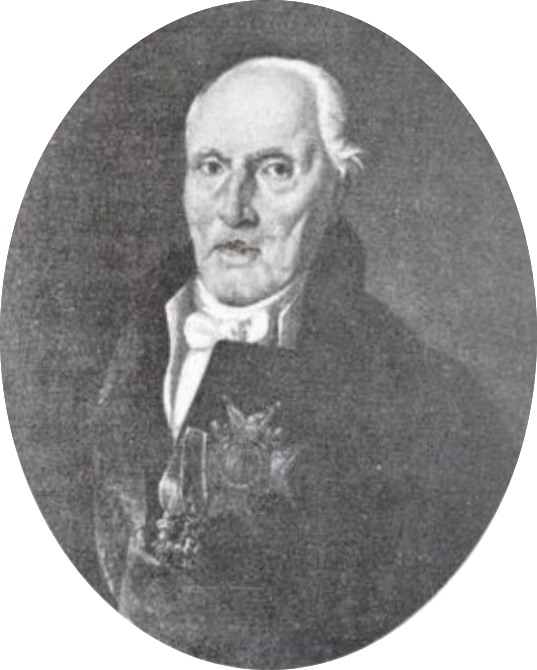
- Born: 3 March 1736 Butot, France
- Died: 16 December 1819 (aged 83) Le Bois-Robert, France
- Branch: French Navy
- Rank: captain
- Conflicts: War of American Independence

Charles Isambart de Médine (3 March 1736 in Butot – 16 December 1819 in Le Bois-Robert) was a French Navy officer. He served in the American Revolutionary War.

== Biography ==
Médine was born to a noble family. He joined the Navy as a Garde-Marine on 4 July 1754. He was promoted to Lieutenant on 18 August 1767, and to Captain on 13 March 1779.

In 1780, he was the flag captain of Admiral Ternay d'Arsac on the 80-gun Duc de Bourgogne.

Médine took part in the Battle of Cape Henry on 16 March 1781, captaining the 74-gun Neptune. He was wounded in the engagement.

In January or February of 1782, he was given command of the 50-gun Experiment. He captained her at the Battle of Saint Kitts on 25 January 1782. He later commanded the 64-gun Réfléchi at the Battle of the Saintes on 12 April 1782.

He was one of the French founding members of the Society of Cincinnati.

By 1786, he was one of the chefs de division of the French Navy.

== Citations and references ==
Citations

References

- Lacour-Gayet, Georges (1910). La marine militaire de la France sous le règne de Louis XVI. Paris: Honoré Champion.
- La Monneraye, Pierre-Bruno-Jean (1998). Souvenirs de 1760 à 1791. Librairie Droz. ISBN 9782745300799. OCLC 165892922.
- Troude, Onésime-Joachim (1867). Batailles navales de la France (in French). Vol. 2. Challamel ainé.
- Ludovic de Contenson, La Société des Cincinnati de France et la guerre d'Amérique (1778-1783), A. Picard, 1934

External links

- Rouxel, Jean-Christophe. "Charles Isambart de MEDINE". Parcours de vie dans la Royale.
