= Communauté de communes des Trois Rivières =

Communauté de communes des Trois Rivières ("association of communes of the three rivers") may refer to the following associations in France:

- Communauté de communes des Trois Rivières, Aisne
- Communauté de communes des Trois Rivières, Calvados
- Communauté de communes des Trois Rivières, Côtes-d'Armor
- Communauté de communes des Trois Rivières, Eure-et-Loir
- Communauté de communes des Trois Rivières, Marne
- Communauté de communes des Trois Rivières, Morbihan
- Communauté de communes des Trois Rivières, Seine-Maritime
- Communauté de communes des Trois Rivières, Vosges
