= Gueutteville =

- Commune
- Location of Gueutteville
- Location within France Location within Normandy
- Coordinates: 49°39′01″N 1°00′20″E
- Country: France
- Region: Normandy
- Department: Seine-Maritime
- Arrondissement: Dieppe
- Canton: Luneray
- Intercommunality: CC Terroir de Caux

Government
  - Mayor (2020–2026): Marie-France Beaucamp
- Area^{1}: 2.99 km^{2} (1.15 sq mi)
- Elevation: 160 m (520 ft)
- Highest elevation: 174 m (571 ft)
- Lowest elevation: 140 m (460 ft)
- Population (2023): 75
  - Density: 25/km^{2} (65/sq mi)
- Time zone: UTC+01:00 (CET)
  - Summer (DST): UTC+02:00 (CEST)
- INSEE/Postal code: 76335 /76890
- ^{1} French Land Register data, which excludes lakes, ponds, glaciers > 1 km^{2} (0.386 sq mi or 247 acres) and river estuaries.

Gueutteville (French pronunciation: [ɡøtvil]) is a commune in the Seine-Maritime department in the Normandy region in northern France.

== Geography ==
A very small farming village situated some 15 miles (24 km) north of Rouen, at the junction of the D22, D63 and the D253 roads. The A29 autoroute passes through the southern section of the commune's territory.

== Population ==
Historical population
Year	Pop.	±% p.a.
1968	67	—
1975	52	−3.56%
1982	59	+1.82%
1990	67	+1.60%
1999	66	−0.17%
2007	72	+1.09%
2012	81	+2.38%
2017	85	+0.97%
2023	75	−2.06%
Source: INSEE

== Places of interest ==
- The church of Notre-Dame, dating from the thirteenth century.
- An eighteenth-century château.

== See also ==
- Communes of the Seine-Maritime department
