= La Chapelle-du-Bourgay =

- Commune
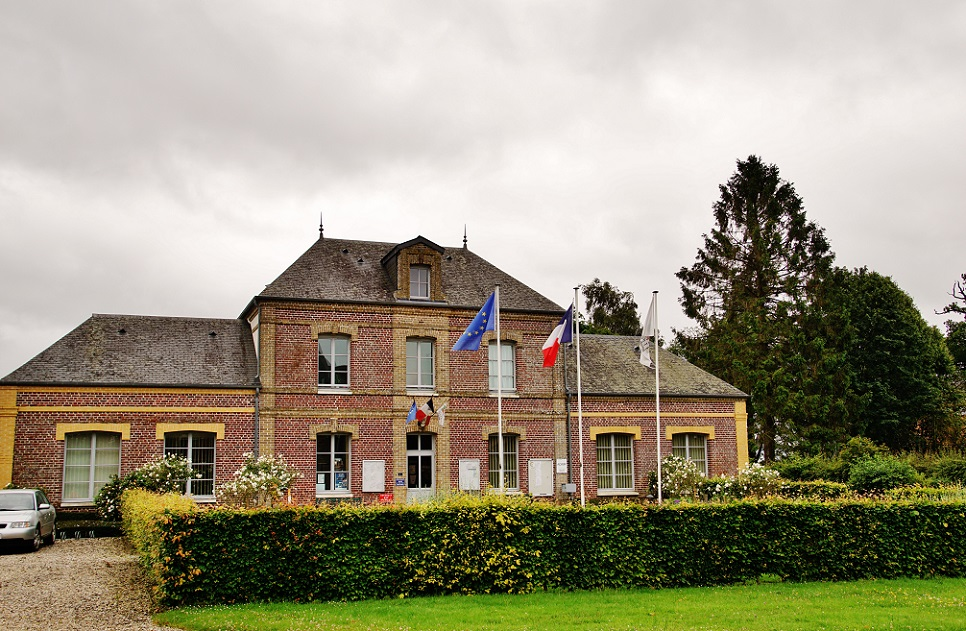
- Town hall.
- Location of La Chapelle-du-Bourgay
- Location within France Location within Normandy
- Coordinates: 49°49′20″N 1°08′57″E
- Country: France
- Region: Normandy
- Department: Seine-Maritime
- Arrondissement: Dieppe
- Canton: Luneray
- Intercommunality: CC Terroir de Caux

Government
  - Mayor (2020–2026): Vincent Grizard
- Area^{1}: 2.99 km^{2} (1.15 sq mi)
- Elevation: 140 m (460 ft)
- Highest elevation: 143 m (469 ft)
- Lowest elevation: 67 m (220 ft)
- Population (2023): 107
  - Density: 35.8/km^{2} (92.7/sq mi)
- Time zone: UTC+01:00 (CET)
  - Summer (DST): UTC+02:00 (CEST)
- INSEE/Postal code: 76170 /76590
- ^{1} French Land Register data, which excludes lakes, ponds, glaciers > 1 km^{2} (0.386 sq mi or 247 acres) and river estuaries.

La Chapelle-du-Bourgay (French pronunciation: [la ʃapɛl dy buʁɡɛ]) is a commune in the Seine-Maritime department in the Normandie region in north-western France.

== Geography ==
La Chapelle-du-Bourgay is a small farming village dominating the valley of the river Varenne in the Pays de Caux, some 8 miles (13 km) south of Dieppe at the junction of the D 915 and the D 107 roads.

== Population ==
Historical population

Year	Pop.	±% p.a.
1793	137	—
1821	178	+0.94%
1846	198	+0.43%
1872	161	−0.79%
1901	127	−0.81%
1926	122	−0.16%
1946	130	+0.32%
1962	130	+0.00%
1968	110	−2.75%

Year	Pop.	±% p.a.
1975	112	+0.26%
1982	110	−0.26%
1990	123	+1.41%
1999	95	−2.83%
2007	133	+4.30%
2012	128	−0.76%
2017	130	+0.31%
2023	107	−3.19%

Source: EHESS and INSEE (1968-2023)

== Places of interest ==
- The church of St.Pierre, dating from the nineteenth century.

== See also ==
- Communes of the Seine-Maritime department
