= Canton of Luneray =

Coordinates: 49.83°N 0.92°E

- Canton
- Situation of the canton of Luneray in the department of Seine-Maritime
- Country: France
- Region: Normandy
- Department: Seine-Maritime
- No. of communes: {{{nbcomm}}}
- Population (2023): 34,970
- INSEE code: 7620

The canton of Luneray is an administrative division of the Seine-Maritime department, in northern France. It was created at the French canton reorganisation which came into effect in March 2015. Its seat is in Luneray.

It consists of the following communes:

1. Anneville-sur-Scie
2. Auppegard
3. Auzouville-sur-Saâne
4. Avremesnil
5. Bacqueville-en-Caux
6. Beautot
7. Beauval-en-Caux
8. Belleville-en-Caux
9. Belmesnil
10. Bertreville-Saint-Ouen
11. Bertrimont
12. Biville-la-Baignarde
13. Biville-la-Rivière
14. Le Bois-Robert
15. Brachy
16. Calleville-les-Deux-Églises
17. Le Catelier
18. Les Cent-Acres
19. La Chapelle-du-Bourgay
20. La Chaussée
21. Criquetot-sur-Longueville
22. Crosville-sur-Scie
23. Dénestanville
24. Étaimpuis
25. La Fontelaye
26. Fresnay-le-Long
27. Gonnetot
28. Gonneville-sur-Scie
29. Greuville
30. Gruchet-Saint-Siméon
31. Gueures
32. Gueutteville
33. Hermanville
34. Heugleville-sur-Scie
35. Imbleville
36. Lamberville
37. Lammerville
38. Lestanville
39. Lintot-les-Bois
40. Longueville-sur-Scie
41. Luneray
42. Manéhouville
43. Montreuil-en-Caux
44. Muchedent
45. Notre-Dame-du-Parc
46. Omonville
47. Rainfreville
48. Royville
49. Saâne-Saint-Just
50. Saint-Crespin
51. Saint-Denis-sur-Scie
52. Sainte-Foy
53. Saint-Germain-d'Étables
54. Saint-Honoré
55. Saint-Maclou-de-Folleville
56. Saint-Mards
57. Saint-Ouen-du-Breuil
58. Saint-Ouen-le-Mauger
59. Saint-Pierre-Bénouville
60. Saint-Vaast-du-Val
61. Saint-Victor-l'Abbaye
62. Sassetot-le-Malgardé
63. Thil-Manneville
64. Tocqueville-en-Caux
65. Torcy-le-Grand
66. Torcy-le-Petit
67. Tôtes
68. Val-de-Saâne
69. Val-de-Scie
70. Varneville-Bretteville
71. Vassonville
72. Vénestanville
