= Saint-Ouen-du-Breuil =

- Commune
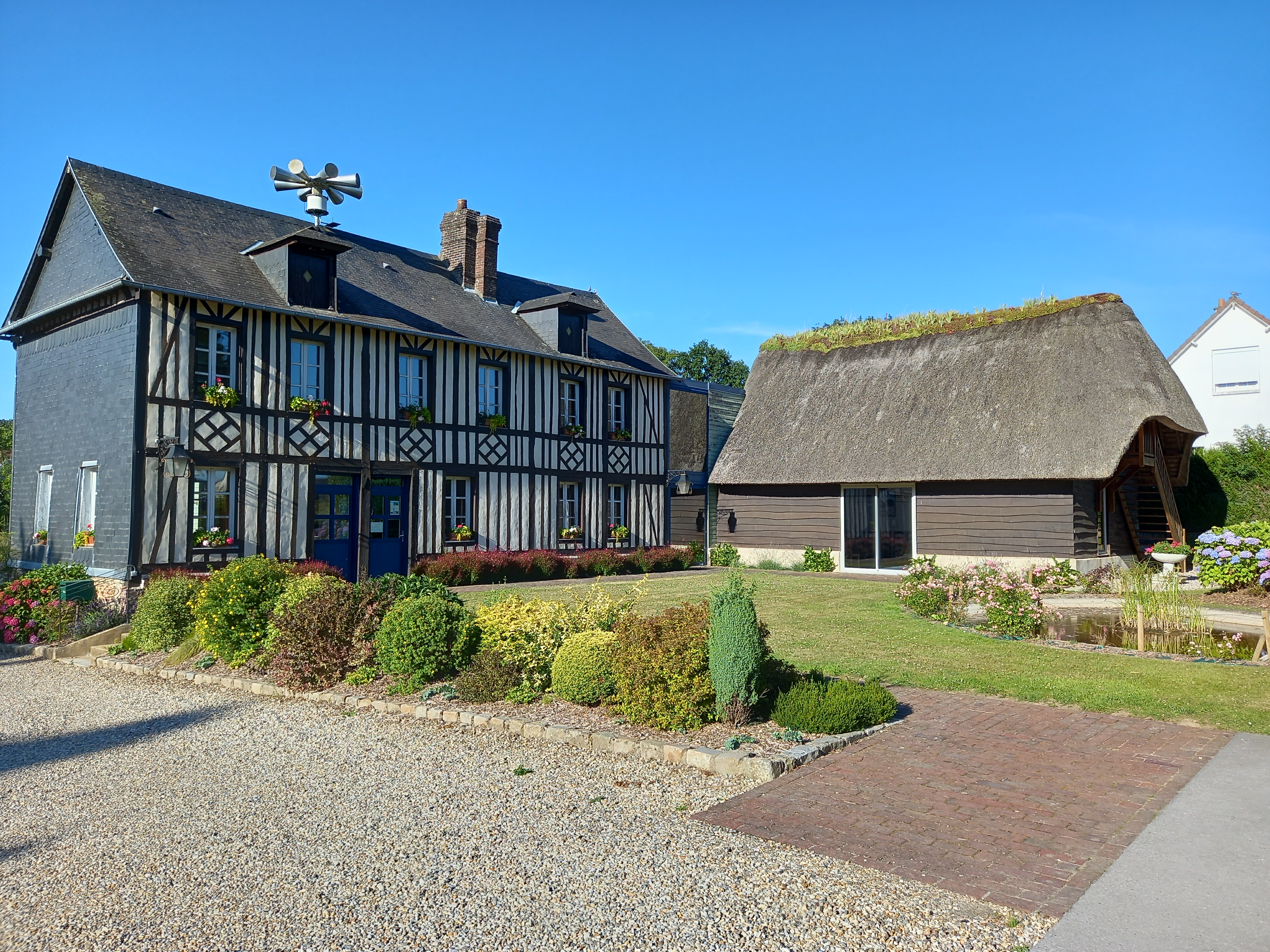
- Saint-Ouen-du-Breuil Town hall

- Coat of arms
- Location of Saint-Ouen-du-Breuil
- Location within France Location within Normandy
- Coordinates: 49°38′22″N 1°00′37″E
- Country: France
- Region: Normandy
- Department: Seine-Maritime
- Arrondissement: Dieppe
- Canton: Luneray
- Intercommunality: CC Terroir de Caux

Government
  - Mayor (2020–2026): Nicole Dehais
- Area^{1}: 6.3 km^{2} (2.4 sq mi)
- Elevation: 175 m (574 ft)
- Highest elevation: 182 m (597 ft)
- Lowest elevation: 154 m (505 ft)
- Population (2023): 924
  - Density: 150/km^{2} (380/sq mi)
- Time zone: UTC+01:00 (CET)
  - Summer (DST): UTC+02:00 (CEST)
- INSEE/Postal code: 76628 /76890
- ^{1} French Land Register data, which excludes lakes, ponds, glaciers > 1 km^{2} (0.386 sq mi or 247 acres) and river estuaries.

Saint-Ouen-du-Breuil (French pronunciation: [sɛ̃.t‿wɛ̃ dy bʁœj]) is a commune in the Seine-Maritime department in the Normandy region in northern France.

== Geography ==
A farming village situated in the Pays de Caux, some 16 miles (26 km) north of Rouen at the junction of the D22 and the D253 roads. Both the A29 and the A151 autoroutes pass through the commune's territory.

== Population ==
Historical population
Year	Pop.	±% p.a.
1968	362	—
1975	377	+0.58%
1982	582	+6.40%
1990	645	+1.29%
1999	685	+0.67%
2007	749	+1.12%
2012	772	+0.61%
2017	778	+0.15%
2023	924	+2.91%
Source: INSEE

== Places of interest ==
- The church of St. Ouen, dating from the thirteenth century.

== See also ==
- Communes of the Seine-Maritime department
