= Le Catelier =

- Commune
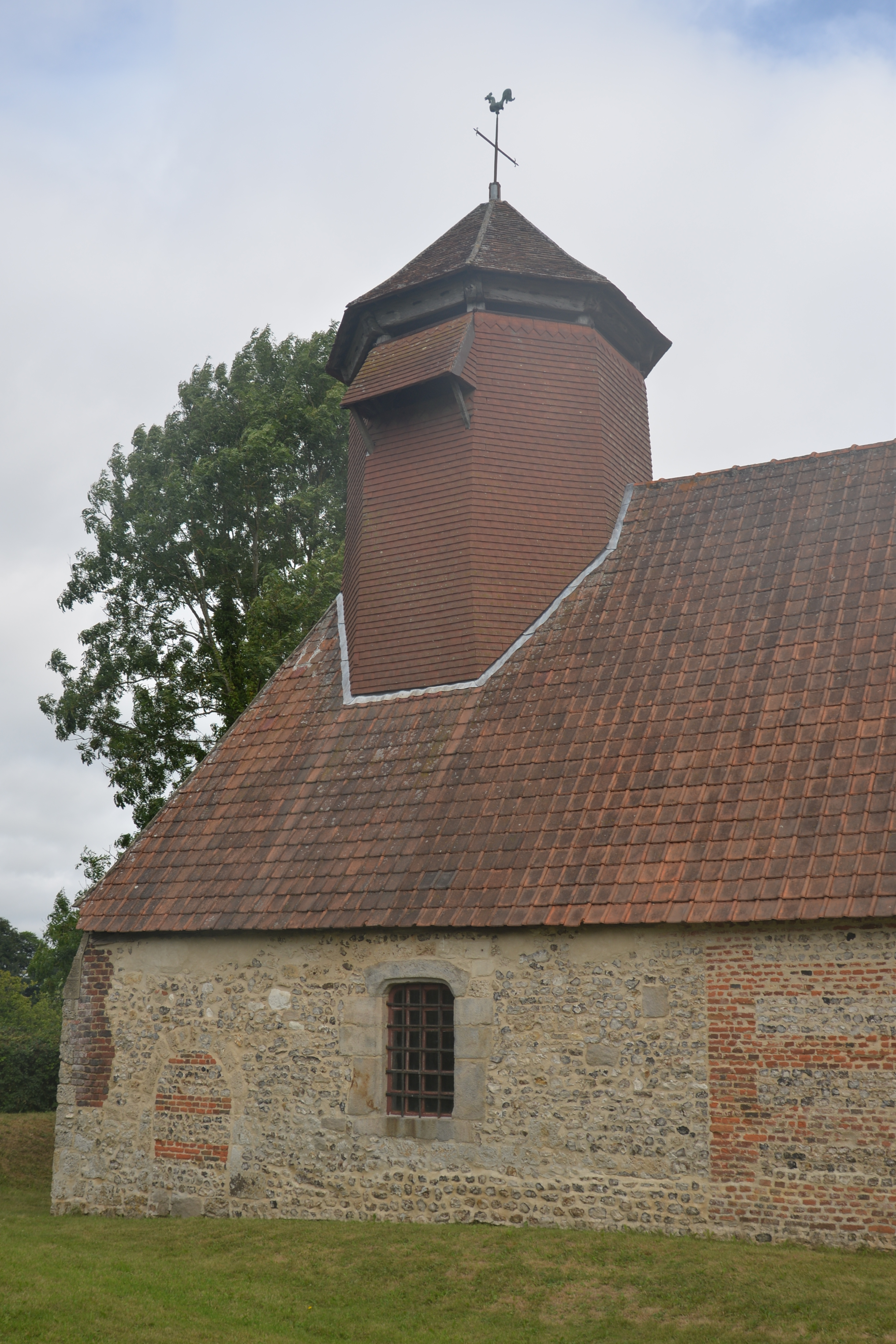
- The chapel in Pelletot
- Location of Le Catelier
- Location within France Location within Normandy
- Coordinates: 49°45′19″N 1°08′58″E
- Country: France
- Region: Normandy
- Department: Seine-Maritime
- Arrondissement: Dieppe
- Canton: Luneray
- Intercommunality: CC Terroir de Caux

Government
  - Mayor (2020–2026): Hervé Rolland
- Area^{1}: 3.84 km^{2} (1.48 sq mi)
- Elevation: 163 m (535 ft)
- Highest elevation: 168 m (551 ft)
- Lowest elevation: 65 m (213 ft)
- Population (2023): 264
  - Density: 68.8/km^{2} (178/sq mi)
- Time zone: UTC+01:00 (CET)
  - Summer (DST): UTC+02:00 (CEST)
- INSEE/Postal code: 76162 /76590
- ^{1} French Land Register data, which excludes lakes, ponds, glaciers > 1 km^{2} (0.386 sq mi or 247 acres) and river estuaries.

Le Catelier (French pronunciation: [lə katəlje]) is a commune in the Seine-Maritime department in the Normandy region in northern France.

== Geography ==
A farming village, situated between the valleys of the Scie and Varenne rivers in the Pays de Caux, some 12 miles (19 km) south of Dieppe at the junction of the D100 and the D476 roads.

== Population ==
Historical population
Year	Pop.	±% p.a.
1968	228	—
1975	238	+0.62%
1982	243	+0.30%
1990	218	−1.35%
1999	223	+0.25%
2007	213	−0.57%
2012	228	+1.37%
2017	261	+2.74%
2023	264	+0.19%
Source: INSEE

== Places of interest ==
- Traces of a castle at the hamlet of Pelletot.
- St.Laurent's chapel, dating from the eleventh century.
- The church of St. Georges, dating from the twelfth century.

== See also ==
- Communes of the Seine-Maritime department
