= Bertreville-Saint-Ouen =

- Commune
- Location of Bertreville-Saint-Ouen
- Location within France Location within Normandy
- Coordinates: 49°48′28″N 1°03′20″E
- Country: France
- Region: Normandy
- Department: Seine-Maritime
- Arrondissement: Dieppe
- Canton: Luneray
- Intercommunality: CC Terroir de Caux

Government
  - Mayor (2026–32): Thérèse Calais
- Area^{1}: 6.67 km^{2} (2.58 sq mi)
- Elevation: 100 m (330 ft)
- Highest elevation: 122 m (400 ft)
- Lowest elevation: 85 m (279 ft)
- Population (2023): 347
  - Density: 52.0/km^{2} (135/sq mi)
- Time zone: UTC+01:00 (CET)
  - Summer (DST): UTC+02:00 (CEST)
- INSEE/Postal code: 76085 /76590
- ^{1} French Land Register data, which excludes lakes, ponds, glaciers > 1 km^{2} (0.386 sq mi or 247 acres) and river estuaries.

Bertreville-Saint-Ouen (French pronunciation: [bɛʁtʁəvil sɛ̃t‿wɛ̃]) is a commune in the Seine-Maritime department in the Normandy region in northern France.

== Geography ==
A farming village in the Pays de Caux, situated some 10 miles (16 km) south of Dieppe, at the junction of the N27, D23 and the D306 roads.

== Population ==
Historical population
Year	Pop.	±% p.a.
1968	296	—
1975	263	−1.67%
1982	298	+1.80%
1990	315	+0.70%
1999	285	−1.11%
2007	327	+1.73%
2012	351	+1.43%
2017	345	−0.34%
2023	347	+0.10%
Source: INSEE

== Places of interest ==
- The church of St.Michel, dating from the thirteenth century.
- The chapel of St.Lubin.
- The church of St.Ouen, dating from the nineteenth century.

== See also ==
- Communes of the Seine-Maritime department
