= Gonneville-sur-Scie =

- Commune
- Coat of arms
- Location of Gonneville-sur-Scie
- Location within France Location within Normandy
- Coordinates: 49°45′21″N 1°04′32″E
- Country: France
- Region: Normandy
- Department: Seine-Maritime
- Arrondissement: Dieppe
- Canton: Luneray
- Intercommunality: CC Terroir de Caux

Government
  - Mayor (2026–32): Williams Delarue
- Area^{1}: 8.73 km^{2} (3.37 sq mi)
- Elevation: 132 m (433 ft)
- Highest elevation: 142 m (466 ft)
- Lowest elevation: 72 m (236 ft)
- Population (2023): 562
  - Density: 64.4/km^{2} (167/sq mi)
- Time zone: UTC+01:00 (CET)
  - Summer (DST): UTC+02:00 (CEST)
- INSEE/Postal code: 76308 /76590
- ^{1} French Land Register data, which excludes lakes, ponds, glaciers > 1 km^{2} (0.386 sq mi or 247 acres) and river estuaries.

Gonneville-sur-Scie (French pronunciation: [ɡɔnvil syʁ si], literally Gonneville on Scie) is a commune in the Seine-Maritime department in the Normandy region in northern France.

== Geography ==
A farming village situated in the valley of the Scie river of the Pays de Caux, some 11 miles (18 km) south of Dieppe, at the junction of the N27, the D96, the D76 and the D203 roads.

== Population ==
Historical population
Year	Pop.	±% p.a.
1968	387	—
1975	375	−0.45%
1982	366	−0.35%
1990	350	−0.56%
1999	348	−0.06%
2007	435	+2.83%
2012	436	+0.05%
2017	465	+1.30%
2023	562	+3.21%
Source: INSEE

== Places of interest ==
- The sixteenth century church of Saint-Valery.
- The chateau of La Vâtine, dating from the seventeenth century.

== See also ==
- Communes of the Seine-Maritime department
