= Saint-Germain-d'Étables =

- Commune
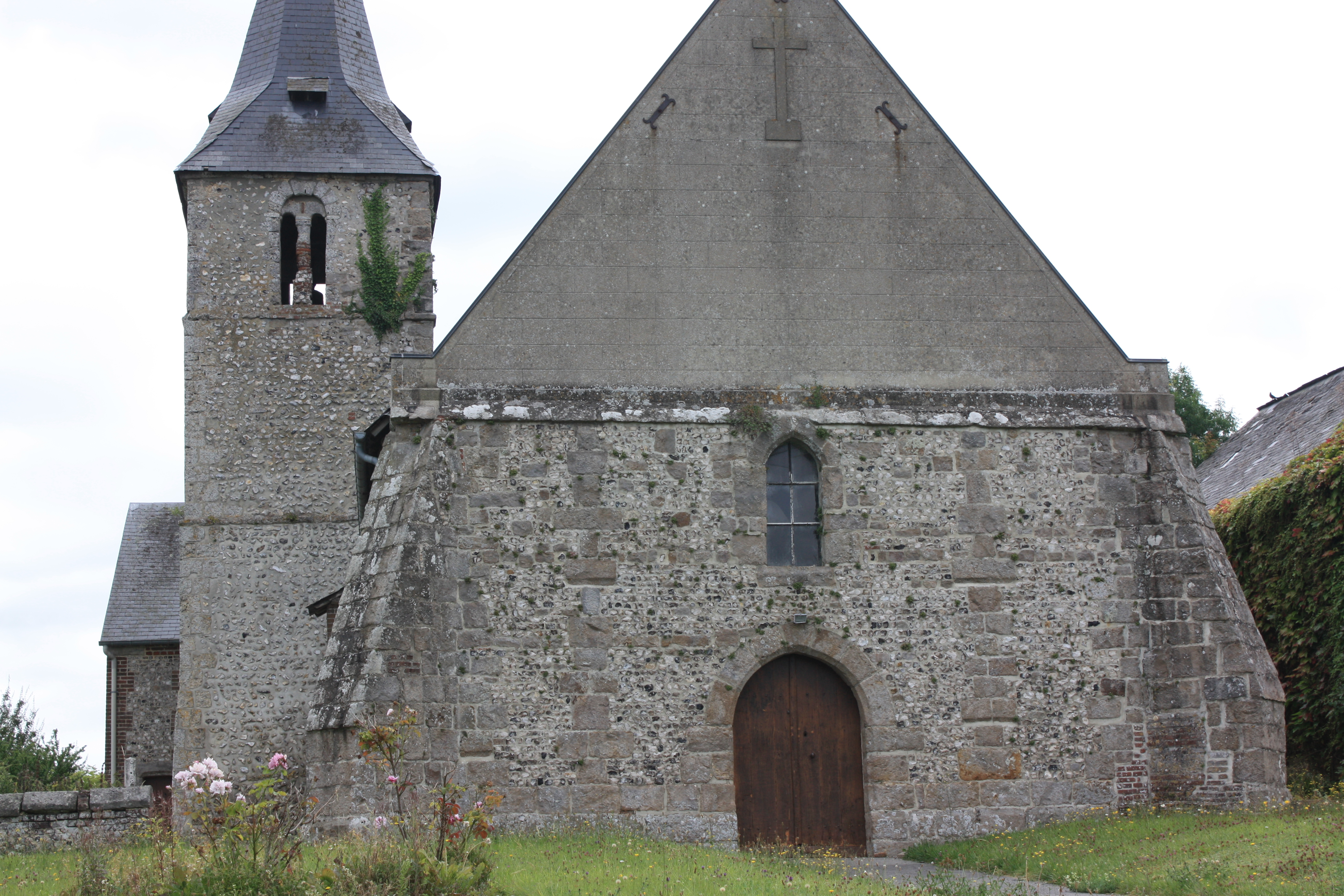
- The church in Saint-Germain-d'Étables

- Coat of arms
- Location of Saint-Germain-d'Étables
- Location within France Location within Normandy
- Coordinates: 49°50′14″N 1°11′00″E
- Country: France
- Region: Normandy
- Department: Seine-Maritime
- Arrondissement: Dieppe
- Canton: Luneray
- Intercommunality: CC Terroir de Caux

Government
  - Mayor (2026–32): Vincent Renoux
- Area^{1}: 7.26 km^{2} (2.80 sq mi)
- Elevation: 28 m (92 ft)
- Highest elevation: 140 m (460 ft)
- Lowest elevation: 14 m (46 ft)
- Population (2023): 240
  - Density: 33/km^{2} (86/sq mi)
- Time zone: UTC+01:00 (CET)
  - Summer (DST): UTC+02:00 (CEST)
- INSEE/Postal code: 76582 /76590
- ^{1} French Land Register data, which excludes lakes, ponds, glaciers > 1 km^{2} (0.386 sq mi or 247 acres) and river estuaries.

Saint-Germain-d'Étables (French pronunciation: [sɛ̃ ʒɛʁmɛ̃ detabl]) is a commune in the Seine-Maritime department in the Normandy region in northern France.

== Geography ==
A farming village situated by the banks of the river Varenne in the Pays de Caux at the junction of the D107 with the D98 road, some 7 miles (11 km) south of Dieppe.

== Heraldry ==
Arms of Saint-Germain-d'Étables	The arms of Saint-Germain-d'Étables are blazoned : Or, fretty gules, on an inescutcheon azure a lion and in chief 2 escallops argent.

== Population ==
Historical population
Year	Pop.	±% p.a.
1968	175	—
1975	172	−0.25%
1982	241	+4.94%
1990	324	+3.77%
1999	298	−0.93%
2007	266	−1.41%
2012	269	+0.22%
2017	263	−0.45%
2023	240	−1.51%
Source: INSEE

== Places of interest ==
- The church of Notre-Dame, dating from the sixteenth century.

== See also ==
- Communes of the Seine-Maritime department
