= Criquetot-sur-Longueville =

- Commune
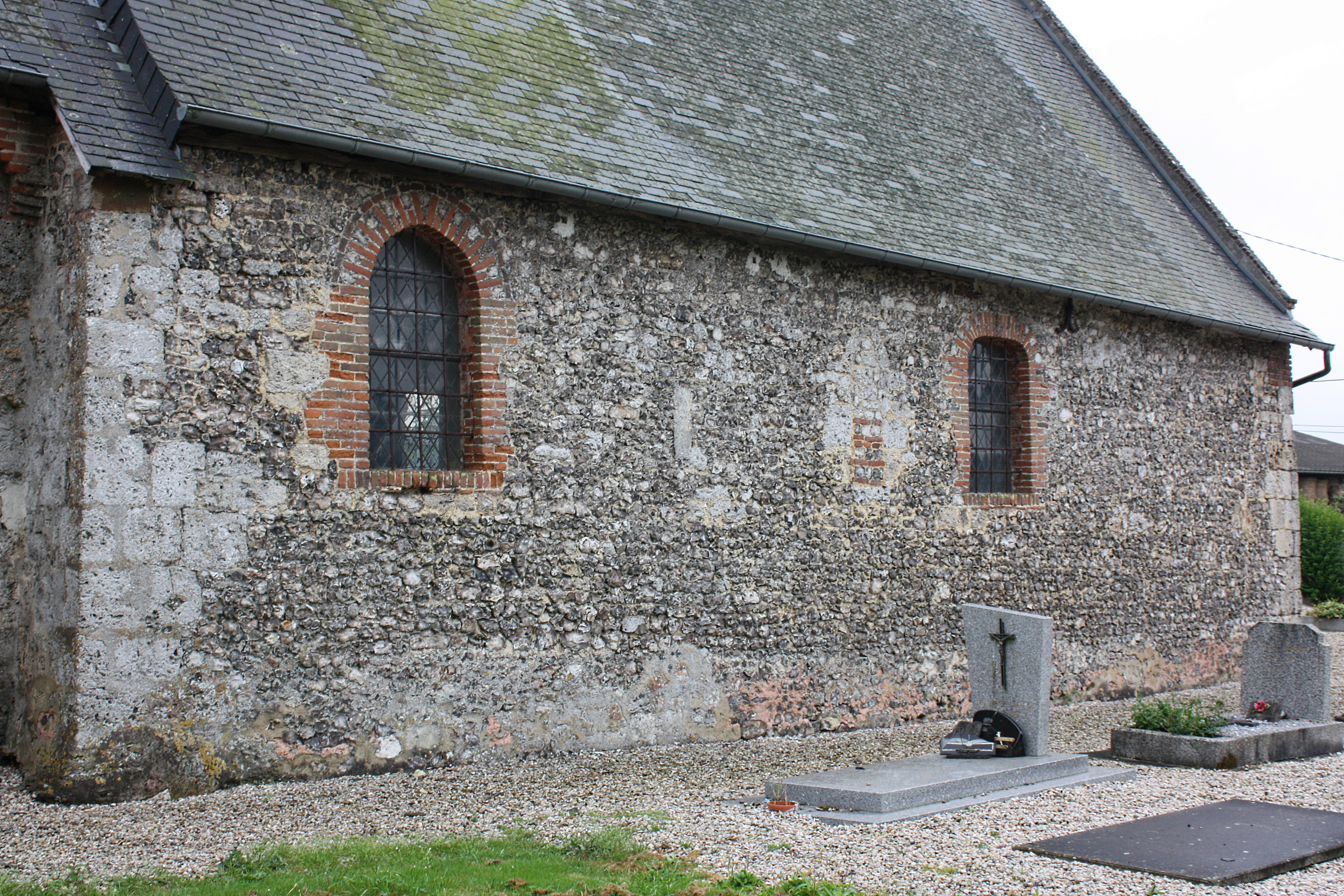
- The church in Criquetot-sur-Longueville
- Location of Criquetot-sur-Longueville
- Location within France Location within Normandy
- Coordinates: 49°46′36″N 1°04′34″E
- Country: France
- Region: Normandy
- Department: Seine-Maritime
- Arrondissement: Dieppe
- Canton: Luneray
- Intercommunality: CC Terroir de Caux

Government
  - Mayor (2026–32): Nicolas Leforestier
- Area^{1}: 7.22 km^{2} (2.79 sq mi)
- Elevation: 101 m (331 ft)
- Highest elevation: 137 m (449 ft)
- Lowest elevation: 75 m (246 ft)
- Population (2023): 221
  - Density: 30.6/km^{2} (79.3/sq mi)
- Time zone: UTC+01:00 (CET)
  - Summer (DST): UTC+02:00 (CEST)
- INSEE/Postal code: 76197 /76590
- ^{1} French Land Register data, which excludes lakes, ponds, glaciers > 1 km^{2} (0.386 sq mi or 247 acres) and river estuaries.

Criquetot-sur-Longueville (French pronunciation: [kʁikto syʁ lɔ̃ɡvil], literally Criquetot on Longueville) is a commune in the Seine-Maritime département of the Normandy region of northern France.

== Geography ==
A small farming village situated in the Pays de Caux, some 12 miles (19 km) south of Dieppe, at the junction of the N27, the D276 and the D149 roads.

== Population ==
Historical population
Year	Pop.	±% p.a.
1968	160	—
1975	137	−2.19%
1982	163	+2.51%
1990	153	−0.79%
1999	159	+0.43%
2007	159	+0.00%
2012	197	+4.38%
2017	228	+2.97%
2023	221	−0.52%
Source: INSEE

== Places of interest ==
- The church of St.Julien, dating from the twelfth century.

== See also ==
- Communes of the Seine-Maritime department
