= Muchedent =

- Commune
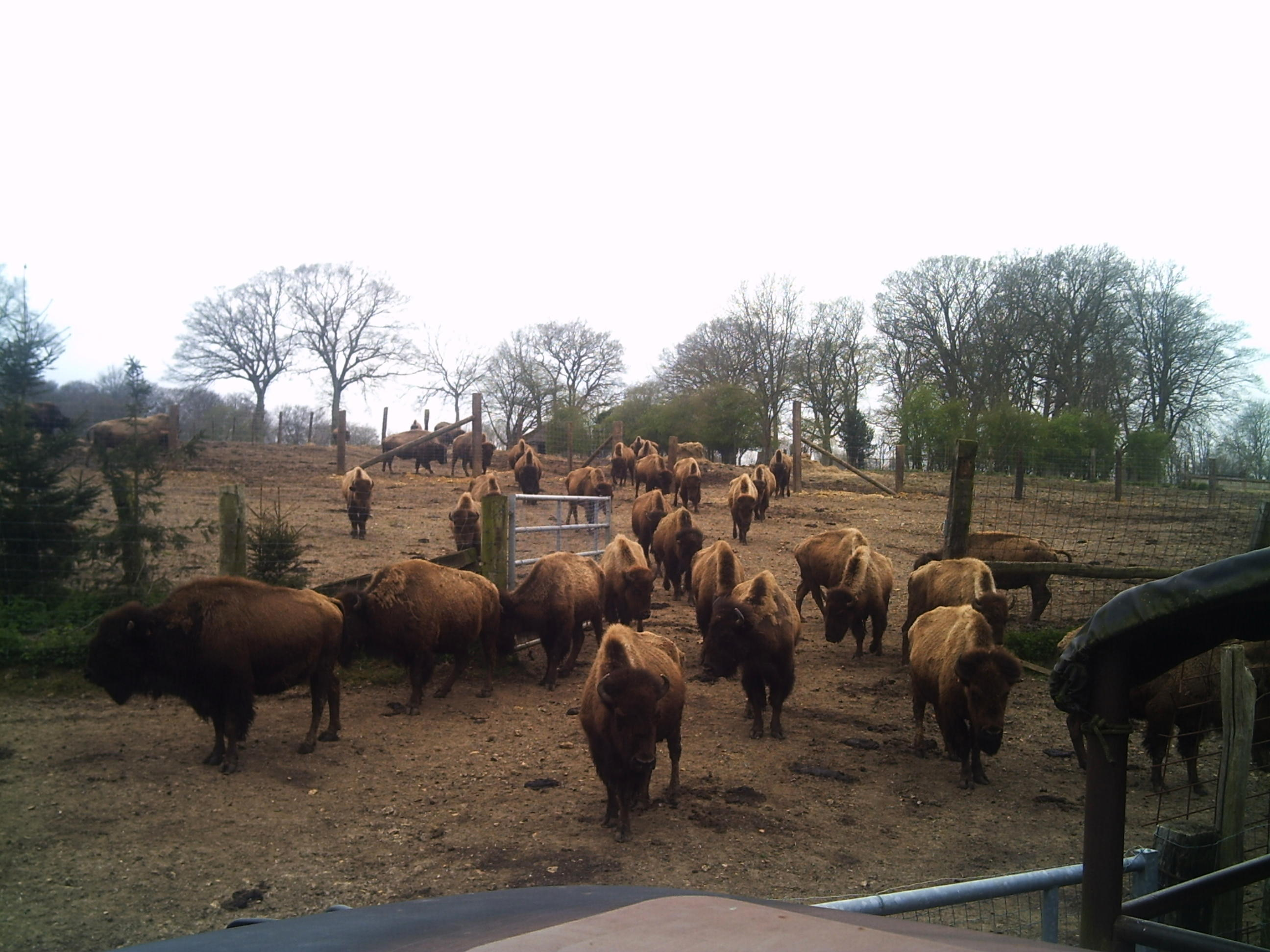
- The bison farm
- Location of Muchedent
- Location within France Location within Normandy
- Coordinates: 49°46′21″N 1°10′59″E
- Country: France
- Region: Normandy
- Department: Seine-Maritime
- Arrondissement: Dieppe
- Canton: Luneray
- Intercommunality: CC Terroir de Caux

Government
  - Mayor (2020–2026): Christine Cressent
- Area^{1}: 7.05 km^{2} (2.72 sq mi)
- Elevation: 60 m (200 ft)
- Highest elevation: 176 m (577 ft)
- Lowest elevation: 43 m (141 ft)
- Population (2023): 131
  - Density: 18.6/km^{2} (48.1/sq mi)
- Time zone: UTC+01:00 (CET)
  - Summer (DST): UTC+02:00 (CEST)
- INSEE/Postal code: 76458 /76590
- ^{1} French Land Register data, which excludes lakes, ponds, glaciers > 1 km^{2} (0.386 sq mi or 247 acres) and river estuaries.

Muchedent (French pronunciation: [myʃdɑ̃]) is a commune in the Seine-Maritime department in the Normandy region in north-western France.

== Geography ==
A small farming village situated by the banks of the river Varenne in the Pays de Caux, some 13 miles (21 km) south of Dieppe at the junction of the D77, the D154 and the D476 roads.

== Population ==
Historical population
Year	Pop.	±% p.a.
1968	112	—
1975	115	+0.38%
1982	96	−2.55%
1990	117	+2.50%
1999	129	+1.09%
2007	118	−1.11%
2012	139	+3.33%
2017	131	−1.18%
2023	131	+0.00%
Source: INSEE

== Places of interest ==
- The bison farm.
- The church of St. Pierre, dating from the eleventh century.
- A nineteenth century château.

== See also ==
- Communes of the Seine-Maritime department
