= Torcy-le-Grand, Seine-Maritime =

Torcy-le-Grand 76
- Commune
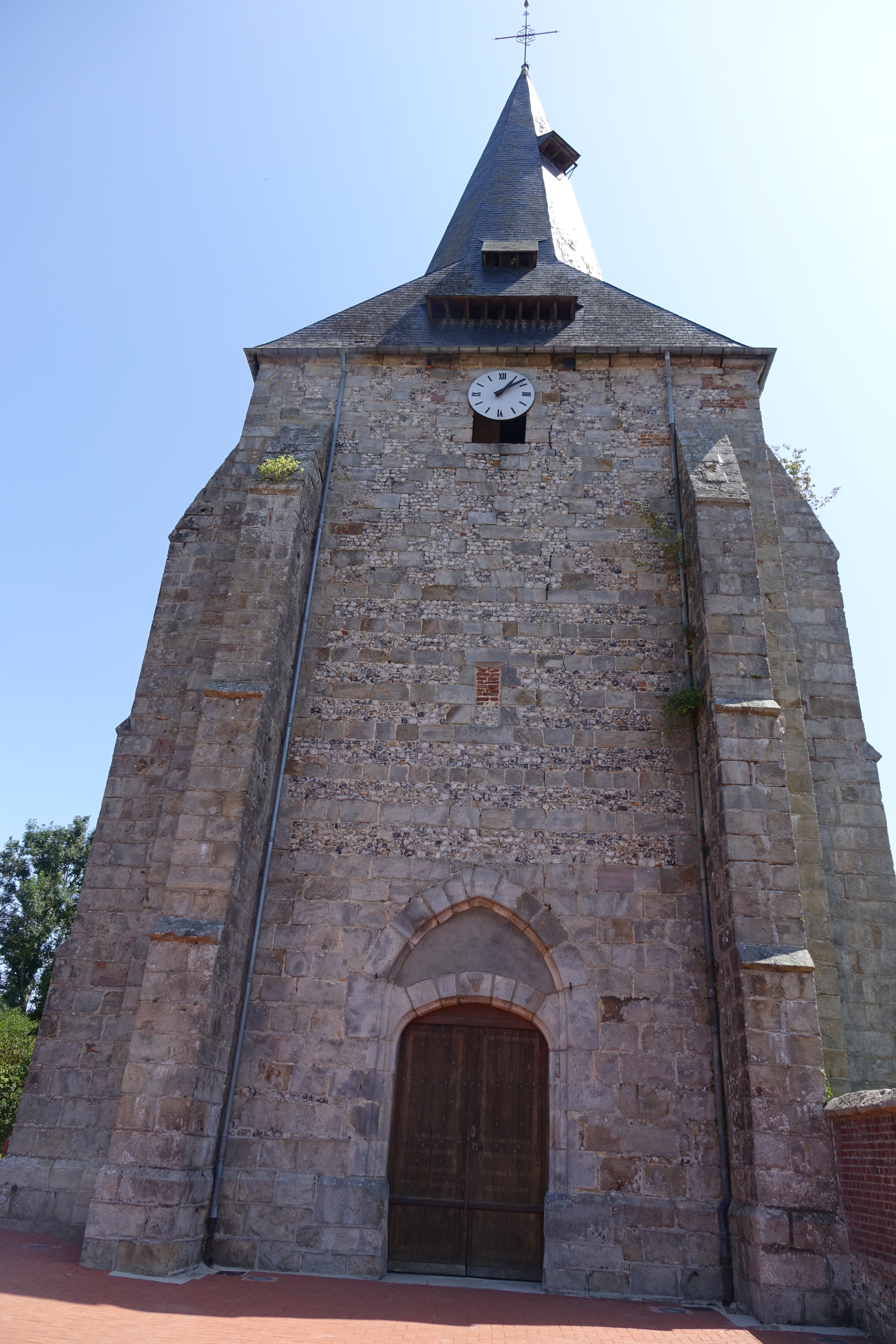
- The church in Torcy-le-Grand

- Coat of arms
- Location of Torcy-le-Grand 76
- Location within France Location within Normandy
- Coordinates: 49°48′00″N 1°10′35″E
- Country: France
- Region: Normandy
- Department: Seine-Maritime
- Arrondissement: Dieppe
- Canton: Luneray
- Intercommunality: CC Terroir de Caux

Government
  - Mayor (2020–2026): Laurent Servais-Picord
- Area^{1}: 8.75 km^{2} (3.38 sq mi)
- Elevation: 39 m (128 ft)
- Highest elevation: 172 m (564 ft)
- Lowest elevation: 32 m (105 ft)
- Population (2023): 788
  - Density: 90.1/km^{2} (233/sq mi)
- Time zone: UTC+01:00 (CET)
  - Summer (DST): UTC+02:00 (CEST)
- INSEE/Postal code: 76697 /76590
- ^{1} French Land Register data, which excludes lakes, ponds, glaciers > 1 km^{2} (0.386 sq mi or 247 acres) and river estuaries.

Torcy-le-Grand (French pronunciation: [tɔʁsi lə ɡʁɑ̃]) is a commune in the Seine-Maritime department in the Normandy region in northern France.

== Geography ==
A farming village situated in the Pays de Caux and by the banks of the Varenne, some 8 miles (13 km) south of Dieppe at the junction of the D915, the D154 and the D149 roads.

== Heraldry ==
Arms of Torcy-le-Grand	The arms of Torcy-le-Grand are blazoned : Barry gules and argent, a lion Or langued gules.

== Population ==
Historical population
Year	Pop.	±% p.a.
1968	576	—
1975	589	+0.32%
1982	611	+0.53%
1990	628	+0.34%
1999	720	+1.53%
2007	713	−0.12%
2012	729	+0.44%
2017	773	+1.18%
2023	788	+0.32%
Source: INSEE

== Places of interest ==
- The church of St. Ribert, dating from the sixteenth century.
- The remains of a fifteenth-century chateau on an island in the river.

== See also ==
- Communes of the Seine-Maritime department
