= Le Bois-Robert =

- Commune
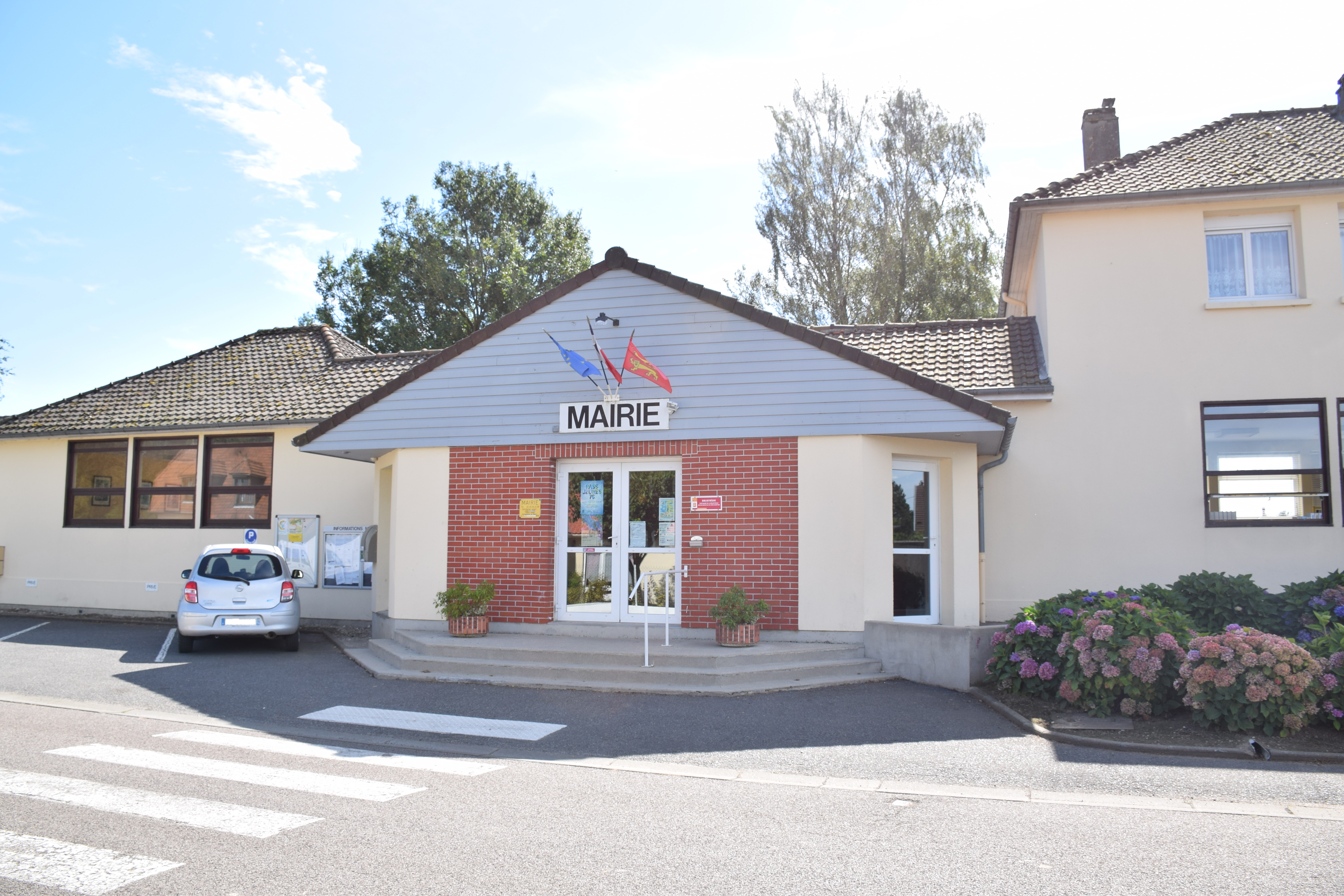
- Town Hall.

- Coat of arms
- Location of Le Bois-Robert
- Location within France Location within Normandy
- Coordinates: 49°50′11″N 1°09′00″E
- Country: France
- Region: Normandy
- Department: Seine-Maritime
- Arrondissement: Dieppe
- Canton: Luneray
- Intercommunality: CC Terroir de Caux

Government
  - Mayor (2026–32): Chantal Cottereau
- Area^{1}: 4.95 km^{2} (1.91 sq mi)
- Elevation: 110 m (360 ft)
- Highest elevation: 138 m (453 ft)
- Lowest elevation: 45 m (148 ft)
- Population (2023): 388
  - Density: 78.4/km^{2} (203/sq mi)
- Time zone: UTC+01:00 (CET)
  - Summer (DST): UTC+02:00 (CEST)
- INSEE/Postal code: 76112 /76590
- Website: boisrobert.net
- ^{1} French Land Register data, which excludes lakes, ponds, glaciers > 1 km^{2} (0.386 sq mi or 247 acres) and river estuaries.

Le Bois-Robert (French pronunciation: [lə bwa ʁɔbɛʁ]) is a commune in the Seine-Maritime department in the Normandy region in north-western France.

== Geography ==
A farming village, dominating the valley of the river Varenne in the Pays de Caux, some 6 miles (9.7 km) south of Dieppe at the junction of the D 107 and the D 915 roads.

== Population ==
Historical population

| Year | Pop. | ±% p.a. |
|---|---|---|
| 1793 | 269 | — |
| 1821 | 306 | +0.46% |
| 1846 | 325 | +0.24% |
| 1872 | 203 | −1.79% |
| 1901 | 200 | −0.05% |
| 1926 | 241 | +0.75% |
| 1946 | 243 | +0.04% |
| 1962 | 273 | +0.73% |
| 1968 | 244 | −1.85% |

| Year | Pop. | ±% p.a. |
|---|---|---|
| 1975 | 204 | −2.53% |
| 1982 | 258 | +3.41% |
| 1990 | 283 | +1.16% |
| 1999 | 280 | −0.12% |
| 2007 | 323 | +1.80% |
| 2012 | 320 | −0.19% |
| 2017 | 351 | +1.87% |
| 2023 | 388 | +1.68% |

Source: EHESS and INSEE (1968-2023)

== Places of interest ==
- The two châteaux dating from the eighteenth century.
- The church of Notre-Dame, dating from the eleventh century.

== See also ==
- Communes of the Seine-Maritime department
