= Crosville-sur-Scie =

- Commune
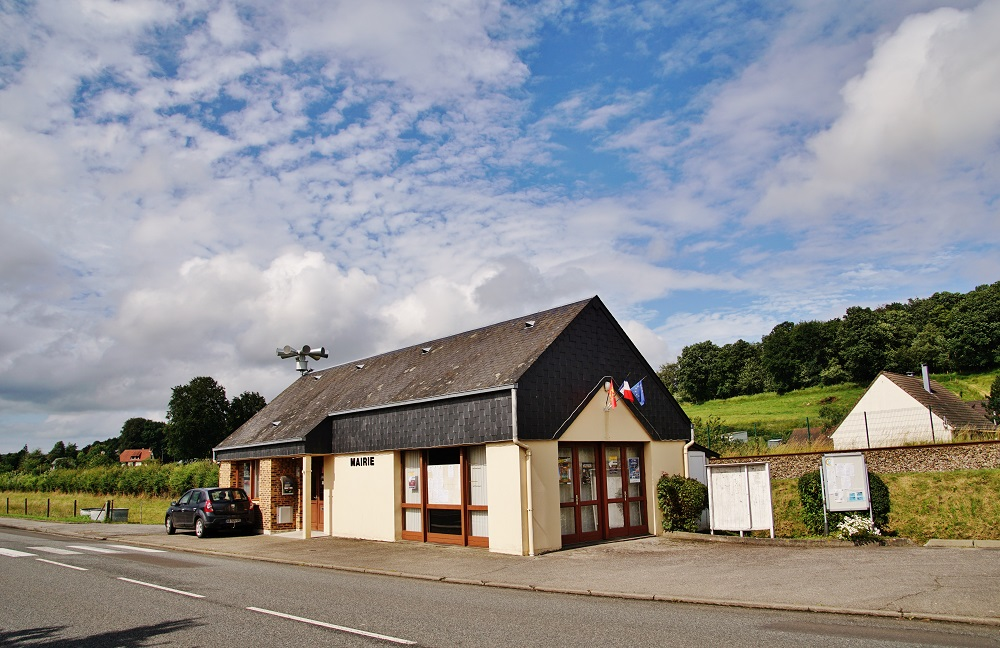
- Town hall
- Location of Crosville-sur-Scie
- Location within France Location within Normandy
- Coordinates: 49°49′22″N 1°05′31″E
- Country: France
- Region: Normandy
- Department: Seine-Maritime
- Arrondissement: Dieppe
- Canton: Luneray
- Intercommunality: CC Terroir de Caux

Government
  - Mayor (2026–32): Alain Dépréaux
- Area^{1}: 3.51 km^{2} (1.36 sq mi)
- Elevation: 50 m (160 ft)
- Highest elevation: 112 m (367 ft)
- Lowest elevation: 39 m (128 ft)
- Population (2023): 225
  - Density: 64.1/km^{2} (166/sq mi)
- Time zone: UTC+01:00 (CET)
  - Summer (DST): UTC+02:00 (CEST)
- INSEE/Postal code: 76205 /76590
- ^{1} French Land Register data, which excludes lakes, ponds, glaciers > 1 km^{2} (0.386 sq mi or 247 acres) and river estuaries.

Crosville-sur-Scie (French pronunciation: [kʁovil syʁ si], literally Crosville on Scie) is a commune in the Seine-Maritime department in the Normandy region in northern France.

== Geography ==
A farming village situated by the banks of the river Scie in the Pays de Caux, some 6 miles (9.7 km) south of Dieppe, at the junction of the D107 and the D3 roads.

== Population ==
Historical population
Year	Pop.	±% p.a.
1968	161	—
1975	177	+1.36%
1982	222	+3.29%
1990	265	+2.24%
1999	236	−1.28%
2007	247	+0.57%
2012	243	−0.33%
2017	248	+0.41%
2023	225	−1.61%
Source: INSEE

== Places of interest ==
- The church of St.Pierre, dating from the eighteenth century.

== See also ==
- Communes of the Seine-Maritime department
