= Montreuil-en-Caux =

- Commune
- Location of Montreuil-en-Caux
- Location within France Location within Normandy
- Coordinates: 49°40′47″N 1°08′58″E
- Country: France
- Region: Normandy
- Department: Seine-Maritime
- Arrondissement: Dieppe
- Canton: Luneray
- Intercommunality: CC Terroir de Caux

Government
  - Mayor (2026–32): Victor Boucher
- Area^{1}: 9.4 km^{2} (3.6 sq mi)
- Elevation: 145 m (476 ft)
- Highest elevation: 174 m (571 ft)
- Lowest elevation: 124 m (407 ft)
- Population (2023): 494
  - Density: 53/km^{2} (140/sq mi)
- Time zone: UTC+01:00 (CET)
  - Summer (DST): UTC+02:00 (CEST)
- INSEE/Postal code: 76449 /76850
- ^{1} French Land Register data, which excludes lakes, ponds, glaciers > 1 km^{2} (0.386 sq mi or 247 acres) and river estuaries.

Montreuil-en-Caux (French pronunciation: [mɔ̃tʁœj ɑ̃ ko], literally Montreuil in Caux) is a commune in the Seine-Maritime department in the Normandy region in northern France.

== Geography ==
A farming village situated in the Pays de Caux, some 20 miles (32 km) south of Dieppe at the junction of the D99, D96, D100 and the D929 roads.

== Population ==
Historical population
Year	Pop.	±% p.a.
1968	411	—
1975	349	−2.31%
1982	367	+0.72%
1990	357	−0.34%
1999	380	+0.70%
2007	428	+1.50%
2012	526	+4.21%
2017	507	−0.73%
2023	494	−0.43%
Source: INSEE

== Places of interest ==
- The church of St. Antoine and St. Sulpice, dating from the thirteenth century.
- Parts of an ancient château (now a farmhouse).
- The manorhouse of Hautot-Mesnil .

== See also ==
- Communes of the Seine-Maritime department
