= Imbleville =

- Commune
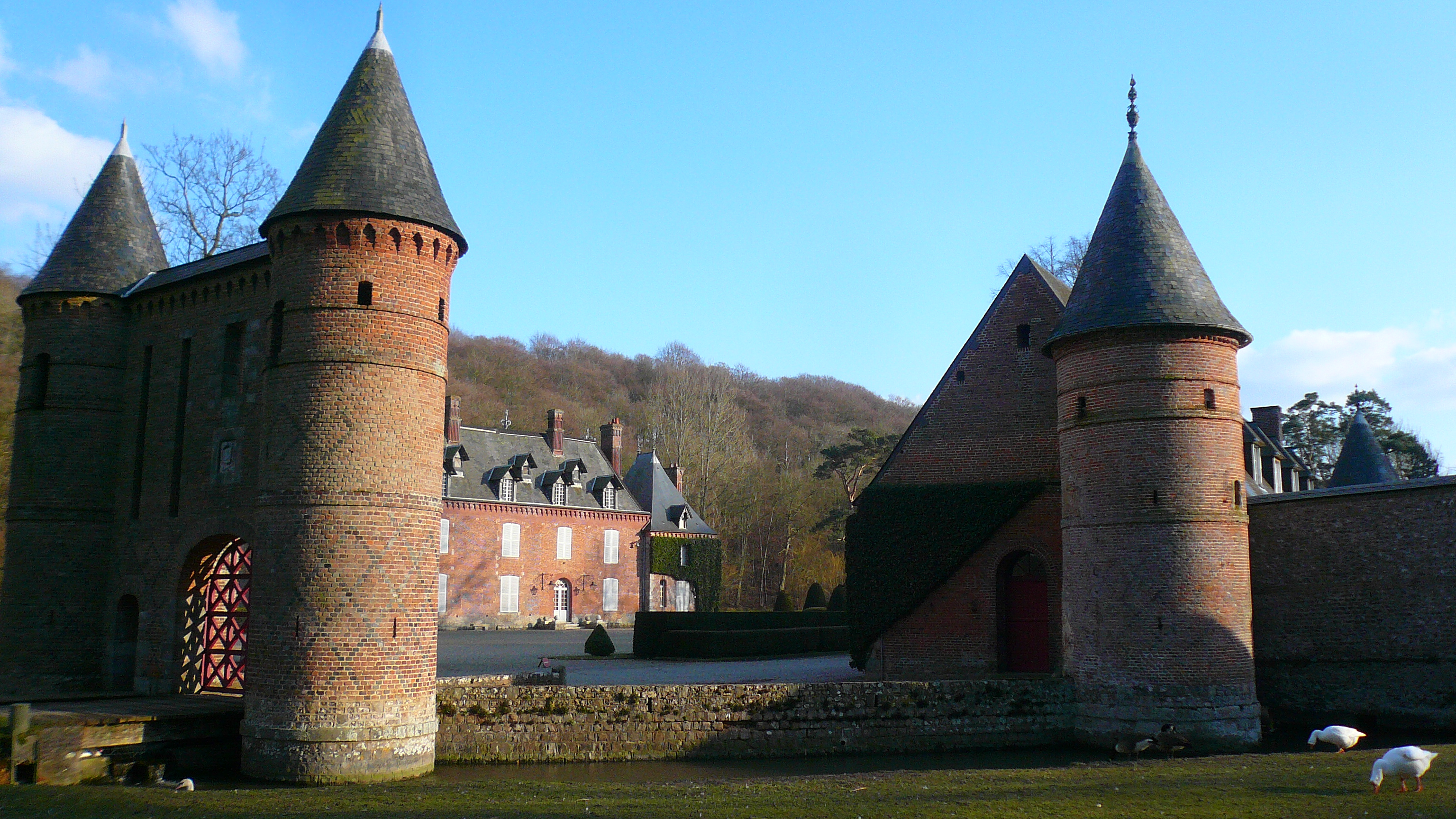
- The chateau in Imbleville
- Location of Imbleville
- Location within France Location within Normandy
- Coordinates: 49°42′58″N 0°57′13″E
- Country: France
- Region: Normandy
- Department: Seine-Maritime
- Arrondissement: Dieppe
- Canton: Luneray
- Intercommunality: CC Terroir de Caux

Government
  - Mayor (2026–32): Robert Végas
- Area^{1}: 5.28 km^{2} (2.04 sq mi)
- Elevation: 83 m (272 ft)
- Highest elevation: 161 m (528 ft)
- Lowest elevation: 75 m (246 ft)
- Population (2023): 321
  - Density: 60.8/km^{2} (157/sq mi)
- Time zone: UTC+01:00 (CET)
  - Summer (DST): UTC+02:00 (CEST)
- INSEE/Postal code: 76373 /76890
- ^{1} French Land Register data, which excludes lakes, ponds, glaciers > 1 km^{2} (0.386 sq mi or 247 acres) and river estuaries.

Imbleville (French pronunciation: [ɛ̃bləvil]) is a commune in the Seine-Maritime department in the Normandy region in north-western France.

== Geography ==
A farming village by the banks of the river Saâne in the Pays de Caux situated some 20 miles (32 km) south of Dieppe at the junction of the D2 with the D25.

== Population ==
Historical population
Year	Pop.	±% p.a.
1968	204	—
1975	200	−0.28%
1982	251	+3.30%
1990	257	+0.30%
1999	276	+0.80%
2007	299	+1.01%
2012	313	+0.92%
2017	307	−0.39%
2023	321	+0.75%
Source: INSEE

== Places of interest ==
- The church of St.Jean-Baptiste, dating from the twelfth century.
- The fifteenth-century château de Bilmorel.

== See also ==
- Communes of the Seine-Maritime department
