= Calleville-les-Deux-Églises =

- Commune
- Coat of arms
- Location of Calleville-les-Deux-Églises
- Location within France Location within Normandy
- Coordinates: 49°42′24″N 1°01′26″E
- Country: France
- Region: Normandy
- Department: Seine-Maritime
- Arrondissement: Dieppe
- Canton: Luneray
- Intercommunality: CC Terroir de Caux

Government
  - Mayor (2026–32): Christophe Colombel
- Area^{1}: 5.71 km^{2} (2.20 sq mi)
- Elevation: 161 m (528 ft)
- Highest elevation: 166 m (545 ft)
- Lowest elevation: 133 m (436 ft)
- Population (2023): 328
  - Density: 57.4/km^{2} (149/sq mi)
- Time zone: UTC+01:00 (CET)
  - Summer (DST): UTC+02:00 (CEST)
- INSEE/Postal code: 76153 /76890
- ^{1} French Land Register data, which excludes lakes, ponds, glaciers > 1 km^{2} (0.386 sq mi or 247 acres) and river estuaries.

Calleville-les-Deux-Églises (French pronunciation: [kalvil le dø.z‿eɡliz], literally Calleville the Two Churches) is a commune in the Seine-Maritime department in the Normandy region in north-western France.

== Geography ==
A farming village situated in the Pays de Caux, some 18 miles (29 km) south of Dieppe, at the junction of the D 101 with the D 203 road.

== Population ==
Historical population

Year	Pop.	±% p.a.
1793	160	—
1821	601	+4.84%
1846	556	−0.31%
1872	462	−0.71%
1901	279	−1.72%
1926	188	−1.57%
1946	175	−0.36%
1962	223	+1.53%
1968	197	−2.04%

Year	Pop.	±% p.a.
1975	178	−1.44%
1982	285	+6.96%
1990	303	+0.77%
1999	305	+0.07%
2007	309	+0.16%
2012	332	+1.45%
2017	332	+0.00%
2023	328	−0.20%

Source: EHESS and INSEE (1968-2023)

== Places of interest ==
- The church of St.Paër, dating from the nineteenth century.

== See also ==
- Communes of the Seine-Maritime department
