= Saint-Crespin =

- Commune
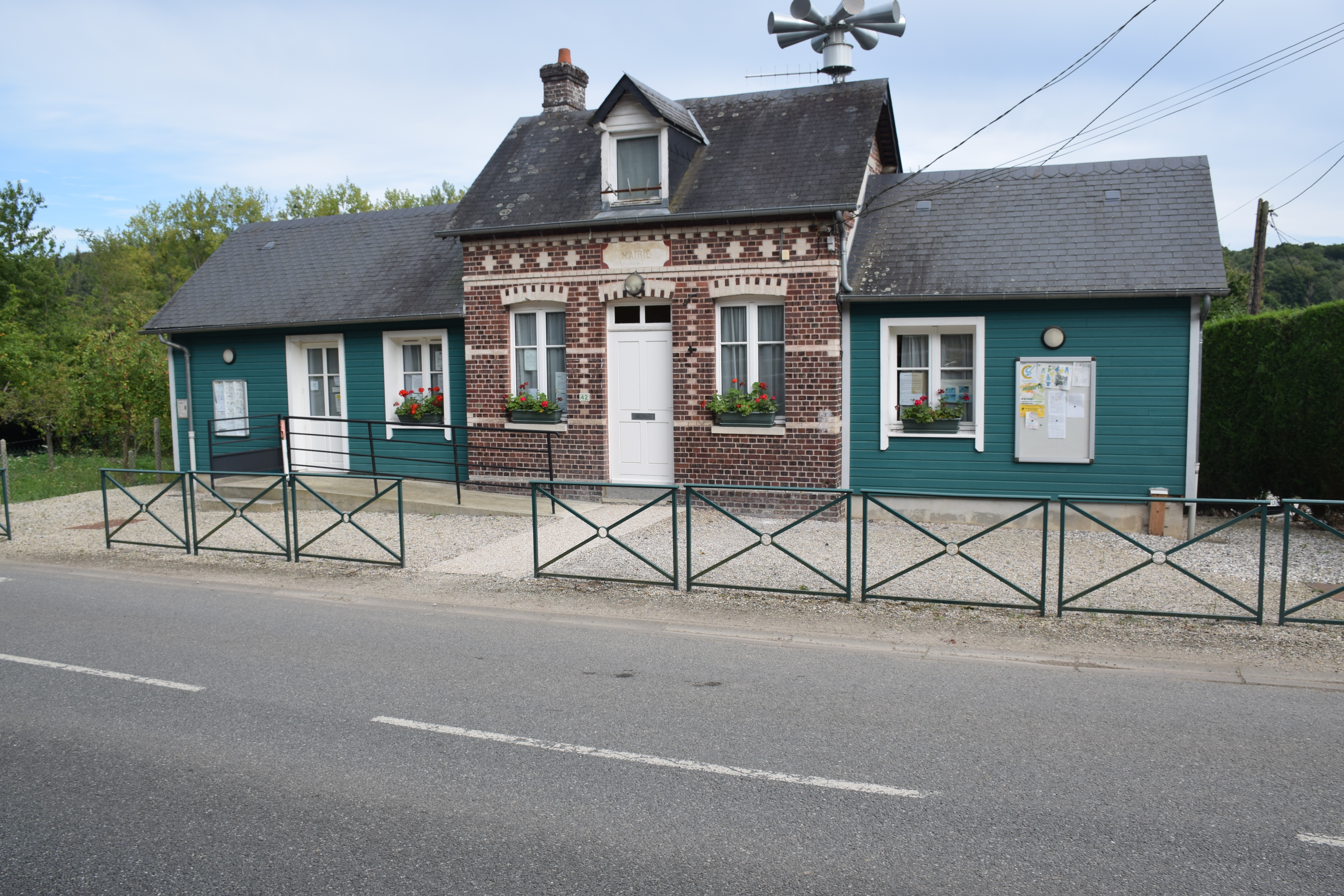
- The town hall in Saint-Crespin
- Location of Saint-Crespin
- Location within France Location within Normandy
- Coordinates: 49°47′01″N 1°06′44″E
- Country: France
- Region: Normandy
- Department: Seine-Maritime
- Arrondissement: Dieppe
- Canton: Luneray
- Intercommunality: CC Terroir de Caux

Government
  - Mayor (2026–32): Sophie Doré
- Area^{1}: 6.35 km^{2} (2.45 sq mi)
- Elevation: 62 m (203 ft)
- Highest elevation: 143 m (469 ft)
- Lowest elevation: 61 m (200 ft)
- Population (2023): 306
  - Density: 48.2/km^{2} (125/sq mi)
- Time zone: UTC+01:00 (CET)
  - Summer (DST): UTC+02:00 (CEST)
- INSEE/Postal code: 76570 /76590
- ^{1} French Land Register data, which excludes lakes, ponds, glaciers > 1 km^{2} (0.386 sq mi or 247 acres) and river estuaries.

Saint-Crespin is a commune in the Seine-Maritime department in the Normandy region in north-western France.

== Geography ==
A farming village situated by the banks of the river Scie in the Pays de Caux, at the junction of the D3, D203 and the D149 roads, some 10 miles (16 km) south of Dieppe.

== Population ==
Historical population
Year	Pop.	±% p.a.
1968	174	—
1975	177	+0.24%
1982	263	+5.82%
1990	283	+0.92%
1999	284	+0.04%
2007	282	−0.09%
2012	288	+0.42%
2017	295	+0.48%
2023	306	+0.61%
Source: INSEE

== Places of interest ==
- The church, dating from the thirteenth century.
- The château de Longueville.

== See also ==
- Communes of the Seine-Maritime department
