= Bertrimont =

- Commune
- Coat of arms
- Location of Bertrimont
- Location within France Location within Normandy
- Coordinates: 49°40′04″N 1°00′06″E
- Country: France
- Region: Normandy
- Department: Seine-Maritime
- Arrondissement: Dieppe
- Canton: Luneray
- Intercommunality: CC Terroir de Caux

Government
  - Mayor (2026–32): Jean-Luc Cornière
- Area^{1}: 4.74 km^{2} (1.83 sq mi)
- Elevation: 147 m (482 ft)
- Highest elevation: 162 m (531 ft)
- Lowest elevation: 114 m (374 ft)
- Population (2023): 227
  - Density: 47.9/km^{2} (124/sq mi)
- Time zone: UTC+01:00 (CET)
  - Summer (DST): UTC+02:00 (CEST)
- INSEE/Postal code: 76086 /76890
- ^{1} French Land Register data, which excludes lakes, ponds, glaciers > 1 km^{2} (0.386 sq mi or 247 acres) and river estuaries.

Bertrimont (French pronunciation: [bɛʁtʁimɔ̃]) is a commune in the Seine-Maritime department in the Normandy region in northern France.

== Geography ==
A small farming village in the Pays de Caux, situated some 20 miles (32 km) south of Dieppe, near the junction of the N29 and the D2 roads.

== Heraldry ==
Arms of Bertrimont	The arms of Bertrimont are blazoned : Quarterly 1&4: Azure, a griffon's head Or; 2&3: Gules, a sword argent; overall an inescutcheon Argent, a heart gules.

== Population ==
Historical population
Year	Pop.	±% p.a.
1968	125	—
1975	117	−0.94%
1982	115	−0.25%
1990	124	+0.95%
1999	195	+5.16%
2007	253	+3.31%
2012	225	−2.32%
2017	219	−0.54%
2023	227	+0.60%
Source: INSEE

== Places of interest ==
- The church of St.Pierre, dating from the sixteenth century.
- The feudal motte.

== See also ==
- Communes of the Seine-Maritime department
