= Dénestanville =

- Commune
- Location of Dénestanville
- Location within France Location within Normandy
- Coordinates: 49°48′42″N 1°05′51″E
- Country: France
- Region: Normandy
- Department: Seine-Maritime
- Arrondissement: Dieppe
- Canton: Luneray
- Intercommunality: CC Terroir de Caux

Government
  - Mayor (2026–32): Claude Pit
- Area^{1}: 2.69 km^{2} (1.04 sq mi)
- Elevation: 53 m (174 ft)
- Highest elevation: 118 m (387 ft)
- Lowest elevation: 45 m (148 ft)
- Population (2023): 282
  - Density: 105/km^{2} (272/sq mi)
- Time zone: UTC+01:00 (CET)
  - Summer (DST): UTC+02:00 (CEST)
- INSEE/Postal code: 76214 /76590
- ^{1} French Land Register data, which excludes lakes, ponds, glaciers > 1 km^{2} (0.386 sq mi or 247 acres) and river estuaries.

Dénestanville is a commune in the Seine-Maritime department in the Normandy region in north-western France.

== Geography ==
A farming village situated by the banks of the river Scie in the Pays de Caux, some 8 miles (13 km) south of Dieppe, at the junction of the D107 and the D3 roads.

== History ==
Danestanvilla 1051, Donestanville 1088, Dunestanvilla 1142. Dunstan's farm, name of an Anglo-Saxon farmer who came from danelaw with the danes, probably in the 10th century, to settle in Normandy. Seat of the family de Dunstanville. See Reginald de Dunstanville.

== Population ==
Historical population
| Year | Pop. | ±% p.a. |
|---|---|---|
| 1968 | 173 | — |
| 1975 | 172 | −0.08% |
| 1982 | 187 | +1.20% |
| 1990 | 251 | +3.75% |
| 1999 | 237 | −0.64% |
| 2007 | 201 | −2.04% |
| 2012 | 239 | +3.52% |
| 2017 | 266 | +2.16% |
| 2023 | 282 | +0.98% |
Source: INSEE

== Places of interest ==
- A château.
- The church of St.Martin, dating from the twelfth century.

== See also ==
- Communes of the Seine-Maritime department
