= Belleville-en-Caux =

- Commune
- Coat of arms
- Location of Belleville-en-Caux
- Location within France Location within Normandy
- Coordinates: 49°42′32″N 0°59′18″E
- Country: France
- Region: Normandy
- Department: Seine-Maritime
- Arrondissement: Dieppe
- Canton: Luneray
- Intercommunality: CC Terroir de Caux

Government
  - Mayor (2020–2026): Denis Guillebert
- Area^{1}: 4.38 km^{2} (1.69 sq mi)
- Elevation: 145 m (476 ft)
- Highest elevation: 162 m (531 ft)
- Lowest elevation: 89 m (292 ft)
- Population (2023): 738
  - Density: 168/km^{2} (436/sq mi)
- Time zone: UTC+01:00 (CET)
  - Summer (DST): UTC+02:00 (CEST)
- INSEE/Postal code: 76072 /76890
- ^{1} French Land Register data, which excludes lakes, ponds, glaciers > 1 km^{2} (0.386 sq mi or 247 acres) and river estuaries.

Belleville-en-Caux (French pronunciation: [bɛlvil ɑ̃ ko], literally Belleville in Caux) is a commune in the Seine-Maritime department in the Normandy region in northern France.

== Geography ==
A village of farming and light industry situated by the banks of the river Saâne in the Pays de Caux, some 17 miles (27 km) south of Dieppe, at the junction of the D203 and the D25 roads.

== Heraldry ==
Arms of Belleville-en-Caux	The arms of Belleville-en-Caux are blazoned : Azure chapé, a cushion Or, on each chapé a partridge gules.

== Population ==
Historical population
Year	Pop.	±% p.a.
1968	210	—
1975	261	+3.15%
1982	305	+2.25%
1990	330	+0.99%
1999	357	+0.88%
2007	534	+5.16%
2012	649	+3.98%
2017	711	+1.84%
2023	738	+0.62%
Source: INSEE

== Places of interest ==
- The church of St. Wandrille, dating from the eleventh century.

== See also ==
- Communes of the Seine-Maritime department
