= Saint-Maclou-de-Folleville =

- Commune
- Coat of arms
- Location of Saint-Maclou-de-Folleville
- Location within France Location within Normandy
- Coordinates: 49°40′52″N 1°06′27″E
- Country: France
- Region: Normandy
- Department: Seine-Maritime
- Arrondissement: Dieppe
- Canton: Luneray
- Intercommunality: CC Terroir de Caux

Government
  - Mayor (2026–32): Benoît Follain
- Area^{1}: 13.21 km^{2} (5.10 sq mi)
- Elevation: 104 m (341 ft)
- Highest elevation: 171 m (561 ft)
- Lowest elevation: 103 m (338 ft)
- Population (2023): 604
  - Density: 45.7/km^{2} (118/sq mi)
- Time zone: UTC+01:00 (CET)
  - Summer (DST): UTC+02:00 (CEST)
- INSEE/Postal code: 76602 /76890
- ^{1} French Land Register data, which excludes lakes, ponds, glaciers > 1 km^{2} (0.386 sq mi or 247 acres) and river estuaries.

Saint-Maclou-de-Folleville (French pronunciation: [sɛ̃ maklu də fɔlvil]) is a commune in the Seine-Maritime department in the Normandy region in northern France.

== Geography ==
A farming village situated by the banks of the river Scie in the Pays de Caux, at the junction of the D929 and the D57 roads, some 19 miles (31 km) south of Dieppe.

== Population ==
Historical population
Year	Pop.	±% p.a.
1968	450	—
1975	435	−0.48%
1982	464	+0.93%
1990	506	+1.09%
1999	515	+0.20%
2007	543	+0.66%
2012	623	+2.79%
2017	632	+0.29%
2023	604	−0.75%
Source: INSEE

== Places of interest ==
- The church of St. Maclou, dating from the eleventh century.
- Ruins of a sixteenth-century château.
- A working watermill.

== See also ==
- Communes of the Seine-Maritime department
