= Saint-Denis-sur-Scie =

- Commune
- Coat of arms
- Location of Saint-Denis-sur-Scie
- Location within France Location within Normandy
- Coordinates: 49°42′20″N 1°05′42″E
- Country: France
- Region: Normandy
- Department: Seine-Maritime
- Arrondissement: Dieppe
- Canton: Luneray
- Intercommunality: CC Terroir de Caux

Government
  - Mayor (2026–32): Henri Dupuis
- Area^{1}: 8.63 km^{2} (3.33 sq mi)
- Elevation: 98 m (322 ft)
- Highest elevation: 161 m (528 ft)
- Lowest elevation: 96 m (315 ft)
- Population (2023): 644
  - Density: 74.6/km^{2} (193/sq mi)
- Time zone: UTC+01:00 (CET)
  - Summer (DST): UTC+02:00 (CEST)
- INSEE/Postal code: 76574 /76890
- ^{1} French Land Register data, which excludes lakes, ponds, glaciers > 1 km^{2} (0.386 sq mi or 247 acres) and river estuaries.

Saint-Denis-sur-Scie (French pronunciation: [sɛ̃ dəni syʁ si], literally Saint-Denis on Scie) is a commune in the Seine-Maritime department in the Normandy region in northern France.

== Geography ==
A farming village situated by the banks of the river Scie in the Pays de Caux at the junction of the D57 with the D22 road, some 15 miles (24 km) south of Dieppe.

== Heraldry ==
Arms of Saint-Denis-sur-Scie	The arms of Saint-Denis-sur-Scie are blazoned : Gules, a leopard Or between 2 plates [argent], and on a chief Or a billet between 2 roses azure, barbed vert.

== Population ==
Historical population
Year	Pop.	±% p.a.
1968	360	—
1975	295	−2.80%
1982	300	+0.24%
1990	349	+1.91%
1999	386	+1.13%
2007	444	+1.77%
2012	579	+5.45%
2017	674	+3.09%
2023	644	−0.76%
Source: INSEE

== Places of interest ==
- The church of St. Denis, dating from the seventeenth century.
- The nineteenth-century chateau of Bosmelet and its park.
- A chapel, once part of a leper hospital.

== See also ==
- Communes of the Seine-Maritime department
