= Sainte-Foy, Seine-Maritime =

Sainte-Foy
- Commune
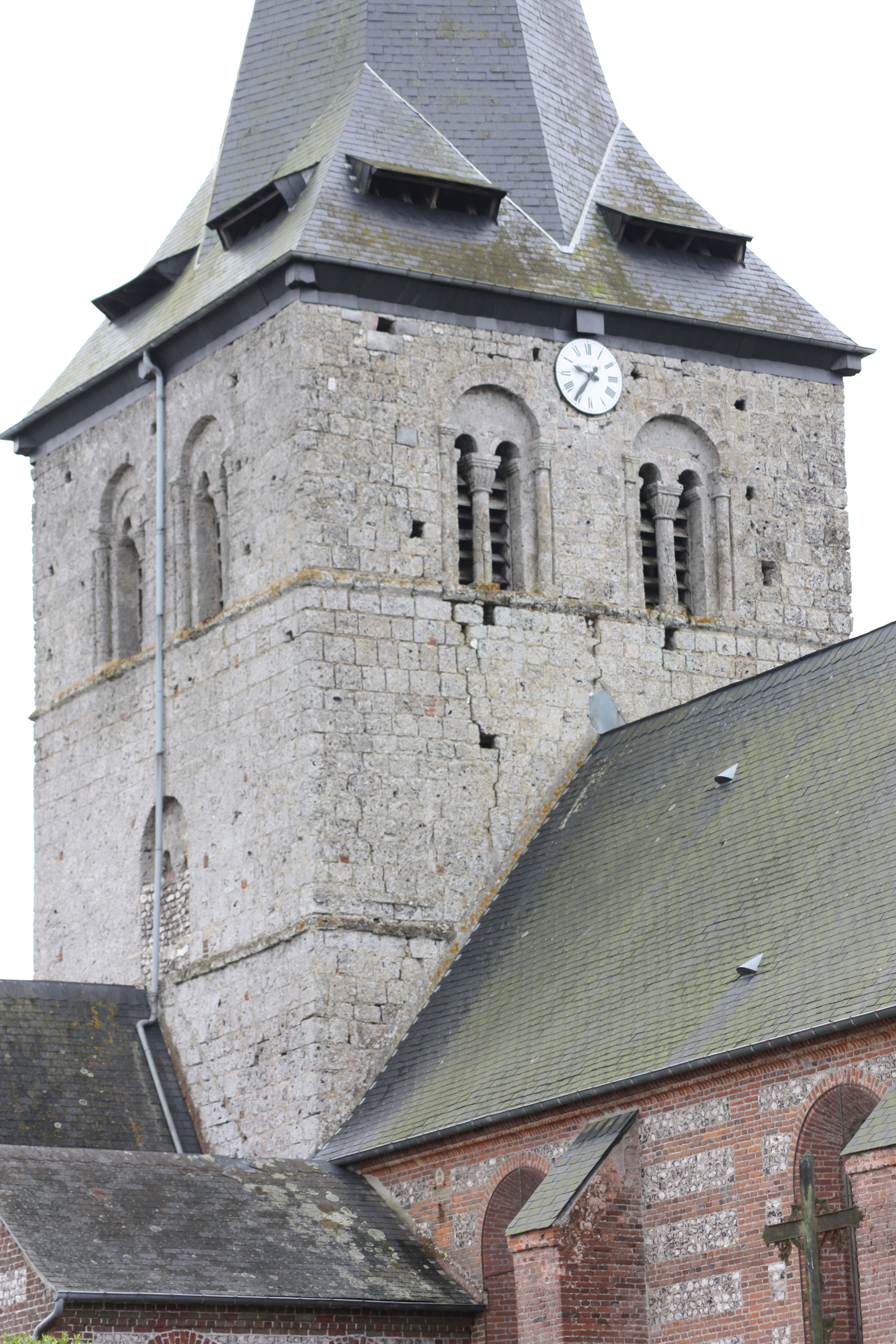
- The church in Sainte-Foy
- Location of Sainte-Foy
- Location within France Location within Normandy
- Coordinates: 49°47′47″N 1°08′10″E
- Country: France
- Region: Normandy
- Department: Seine-Maritime
- Arrondissement: Dieppe
- Canton: Luneray
- Intercommunality: CC Terroir de Caux

Government
  - Mayor (2026–32): David Chandelier
- Area^{1}: 6.72 km^{2} (2.59 sq mi)
- Elevation: 135 m (443 ft)
- Highest elevation: 154 m (505 ft)
- Lowest elevation: 65 m (213 ft)
- Population (2023): 622
  - Density: 92.6/km^{2} (240/sq mi)
- Time zone: UTC+01:00 (CET)
  - Summer (DST): UTC+02:00 (CEST)
- INSEE/Postal code: 76577 /76590
- ^{1} French Land Register data, which excludes lakes, ponds, glaciers > 1 km^{2} (0.386 sq mi or 247 acres) and river estuaries.

Sainte-Foy (French pronunciation: [sɛ̃t fwa]) is a commune in the Seine-Maritime department in the Normandy region in northern France.

== Geography ==
A farming village situated in the Pays de Caux, some 9 miles (14 km) south of Dieppe at the junction of the D100 and the D149 roads.

== Population ==
Historical population
Year	Pop.	±% p.a.
1968	311	—
1975	378	+2.83%
1982	438	+2.13%
1990	405	−0.97%
1999	390	−0.42%
2007	491	+2.92%
2012	564	+2.81%
2017	593	+1.01%
2023	622	+0.80%
Source: INSEE

== Places of interest ==
- The church of St. Foy, dating from the eleventh century.
- An eleventh-century chapel.
- The château and its park.

== See also ==
- Communes of the Seine-Maritime department
