= Saint-Honoré, Seine-Maritime =

Saint-Honoré
- Commune
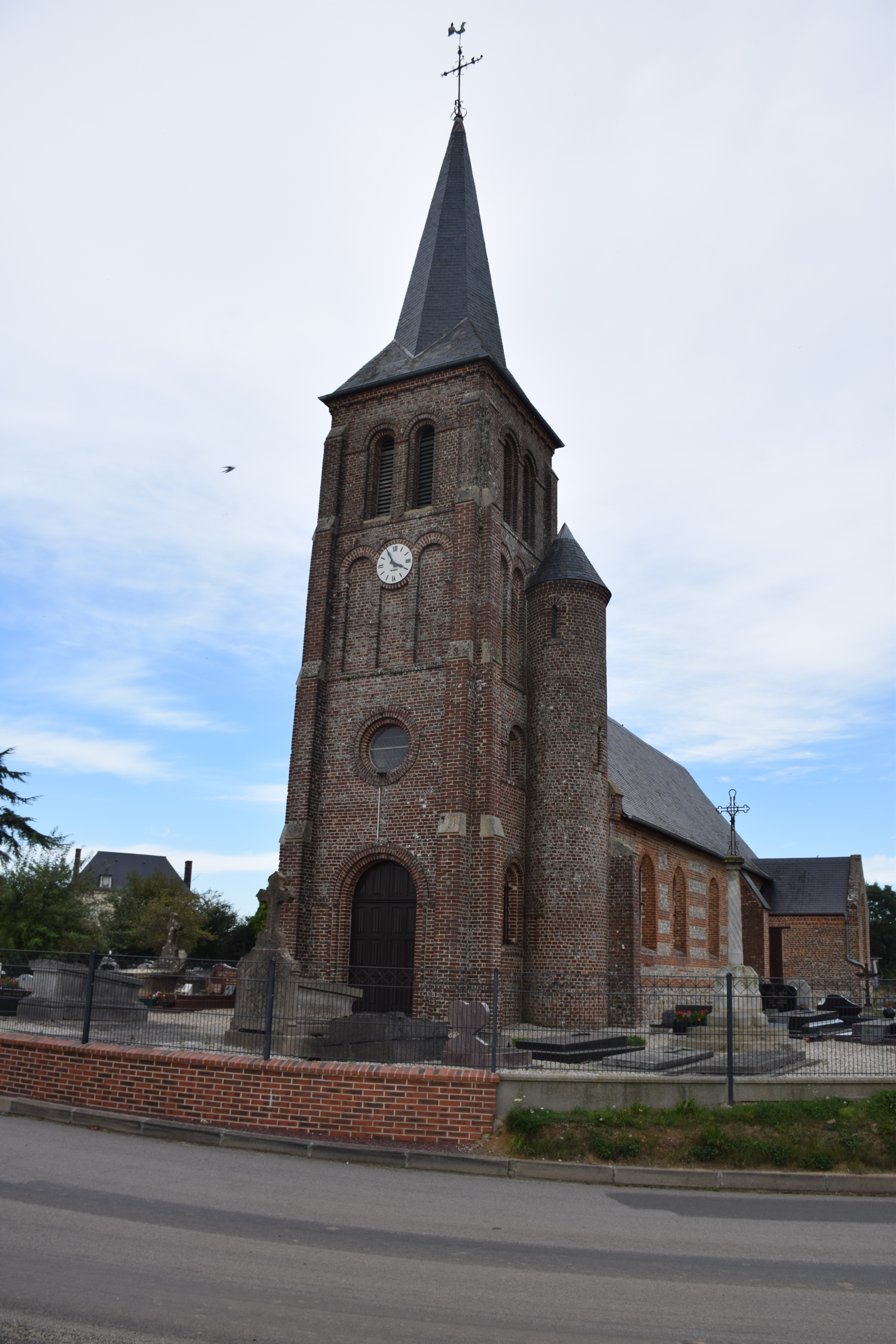
- The church in Saint-Honoré
- Location of Saint-Honoré
- Location within France Location within Normandy
- Coordinates: 49°47′05″N 1°09′26″E
- Country: France
- Region: Normandy
- Department: Seine-Maritime
- Arrondissement: Dieppe
- Canton: Luneray
- Intercommunality: CC Terroir de Caux

Government
  - Mayor (2026–32): Christine Leclerc
- Area^{1}: 3.02 km^{2} (1.17 sq mi)
- Elevation: 150 m (490 ft)
- Highest elevation: 157 m (515 ft)
- Lowest elevation: 65 m (213 ft)
- Population (2023): 197
  - Density: 65.2/km^{2} (169/sq mi)
- Time zone: UTC+01:00 (CET)
  - Summer (DST): UTC+02:00 (CEST)
- INSEE/Postal code: 76589 /76590
- ^{1} French Land Register data, which excludes lakes, ponds, glaciers > 1 km^{2} (0.386 sq mi or 247 acres) and river estuaries.

Saint-Honoré (French pronunciation: [sɛ̃.t‿ɔnɔʁe]) is a commune in the Seine-Maritime department in the Normandy region in northern France.

== Geography ==
A small farming village situated in the Pays de Caux, at the junction of the D100 and the D77 roads, some 9 miles (14 km) south of Dieppe.

== Population ==
Historical population
Year	Pop.	±% p.a.
1968	102	—
1975	118	+2.10%
1982	176	+5.88%
1990	167	−0.65%
1999	172	+0.33%
2007	166	−0.44%
2012	166	+0.00%
2017	208	+4.61%
2023	197	−0.90%
Source: INSEE

== Places of interest ==
- The church of St. Honoré, dating from the eighteenth century.
- A sixteenth century sandstone cross.

== See also ==
- Communes of the Seine-Maritime department
