= La Chaussée, Seine-Maritime =

La Chaussée
- Commune
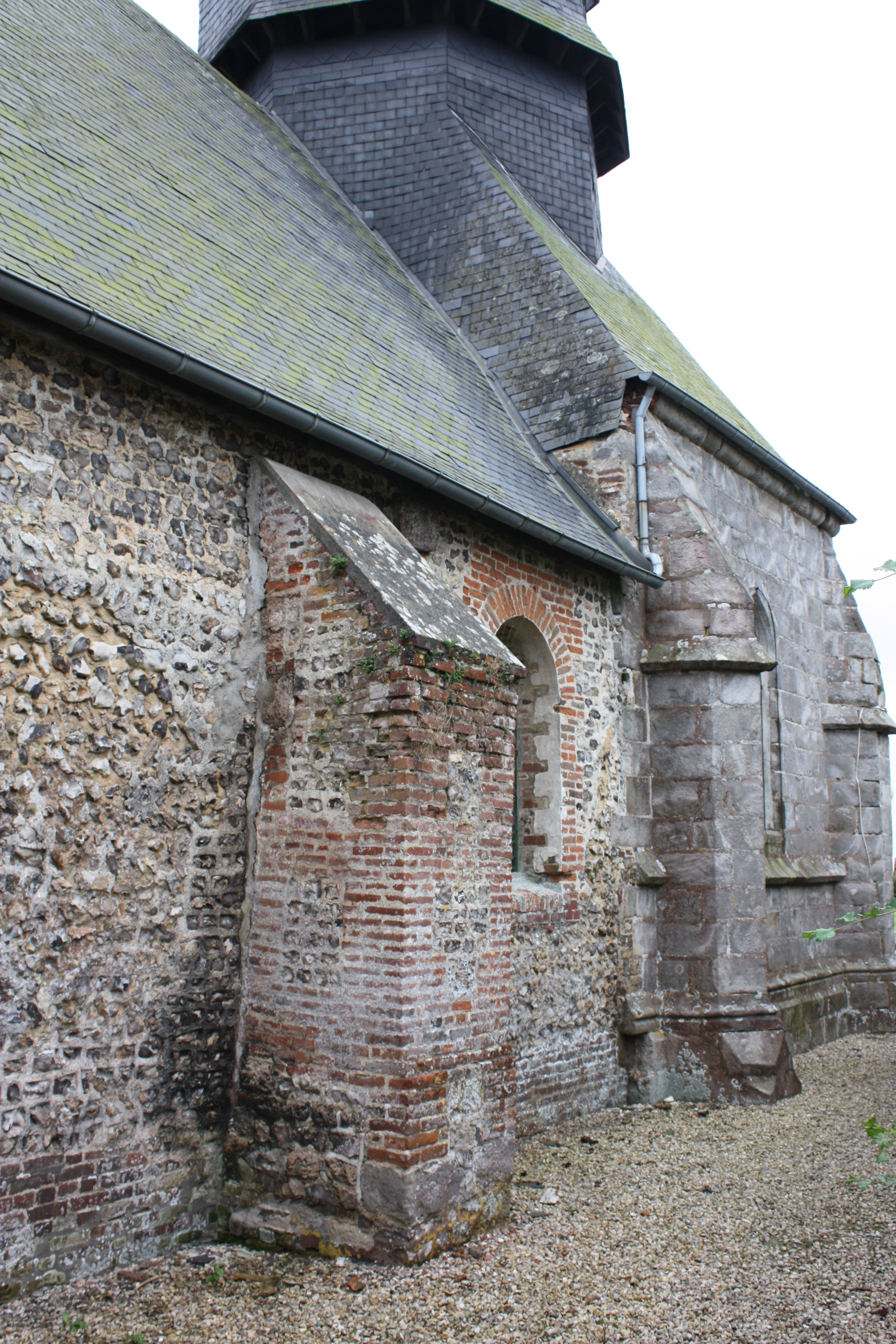
- The church in La Chaussée
- Location of La Chaussée
- Location within France Location within Normandy
- Coordinates: 49°49′30″N 1°07′09″E
- Country: France
- Region: Normandy
- Department: Seine-Maritime
- Arrondissement: Dieppe
- Canton: Luneray
- Intercommunality: CC Terroir de Caux

Government
  - Mayor (2026–32): Séverine Lemoine
- Area^{1}: 8.08 km^{2} (3.12 sq mi)
- Elevation: 120 m (390 ft)
- Highest elevation: 146 m (479 ft)
- Lowest elevation: 47 m (154 ft)
- Population (2023): 561
  - Density: 69.4/km^{2} (180/sq mi)
- Time zone: UTC+01:00 (CET)
  - Summer (DST): UTC+02:00 (CEST)
- INSEE/Postal code: 76173 /76590
- ^{1} French Land Register data, which excludes lakes, ponds, glaciers > 1 km^{2} (0.386 sq mi or 247 acres) and river estuaries.

La Chaussée (French pronunciation: [la ʃose]) is a commune in the Seine-Maritime department in the Normandy region in northern France.

== Geography ==
A farming village situated in the valley of the Scie river in the Pays de Caux, some 7 miles (11 km) south of Dieppe at the junction of the D100 and the D107 roads.

== Population ==
Historical population
Year	Pop.	±% p.a.
1968	210	—
1975	206	−0.27%
1982	238	+2.08%
1990	300	+2.94%
1999	288	−0.45%
2007	430	+5.14%
2012	530	+4.27%
2017	549	+0.71%
2023	561	+0.36%
Source: INSEE

== Places of interest ==
- The church of St.Jean-Baptiste, dating from the seventeenth century.
- The sixteenth century church of Saint-Pierre at the hamlet of Bois-Hulin.

== See also ==
- Communes of the Seine-Maritime department
