= Saint-Vaast-du-Val =

- Commune
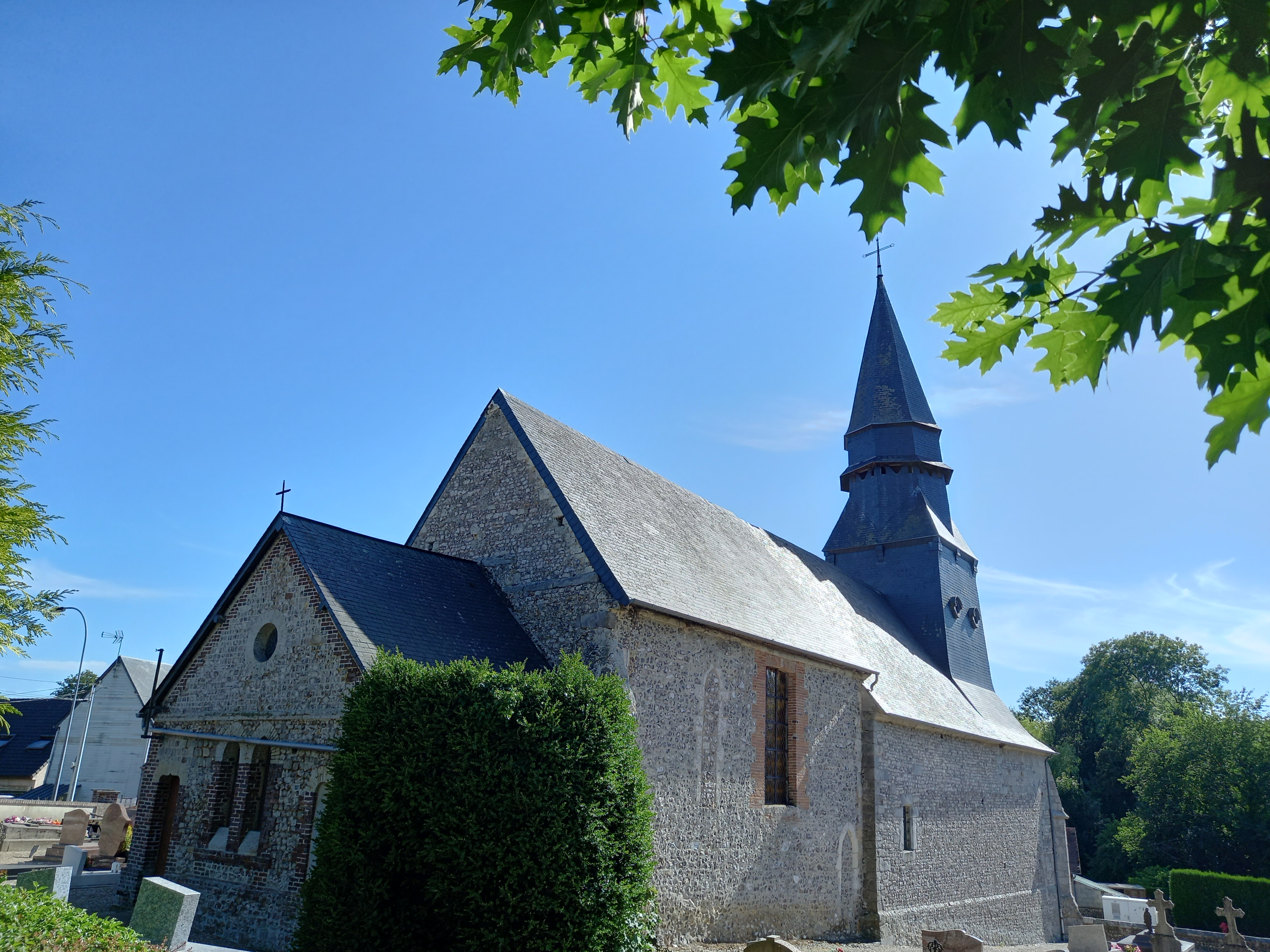
- Saint-Vaast church in Saint-Vaast-du-Val
- Location of Saint-Vaast-du-Val
- Location within France Location within Normandy
- Coordinates: 49°41′23″N 1°00′41″E
- Country: France
- Region: Normandy
- Department: Seine-Maritime
- Arrondissement: Dieppe
- Canton: Luneray
- Intercommunality: CC Terroir de Caux

Government
  - Mayor (2026–32): Patrice Gillé
- Area^{1}: 5.79 km^{2} (2.24 sq mi)
- Elevation: 159 m (522 ft)
- Highest elevation: 166 m (545 ft)
- Lowest elevation: 108 m (354 ft)
- Population (2023): 462
  - Density: 79.8/km^{2} (207/sq mi)
- Time zone: UTC+01:00 (CET)
  - Summer (DST): UTC+02:00 (CEST)
- INSEE/Postal code: 76654 /76890
- ^{1} French Land Register data, which excludes lakes, ponds, glaciers > 1 km^{2} (0.386 sq mi or 247 acres) and river estuaries.

Saint-Vaast-du-Val is a commune in the Seine-Maritime department in the Normandy region in northern France.

== Geography ==
A farming village situated in the Pays de Caux, some 16 miles (26 km) south of Dieppe at the junction of the D252 and the D929 roads. The area is north of Paris.

== Population ==
Historical population
Year	Pop.	±% p.a.
1968	274	—
1975	252	−1.19%
1982	309	+2.96%
1990	285	−1.01%
1999	300	+0.57%
2007	396	+3.53%
2012	473	+3.62%
2017	471	−0.08%
2023	462	−0.32%
Source: INSEE

== Places of interest ==
- The church of St. Vaast, dating from the twelfth century.

== See also ==
- Communes of the Seine-Maritime department
