= Tôtes =

- Commune
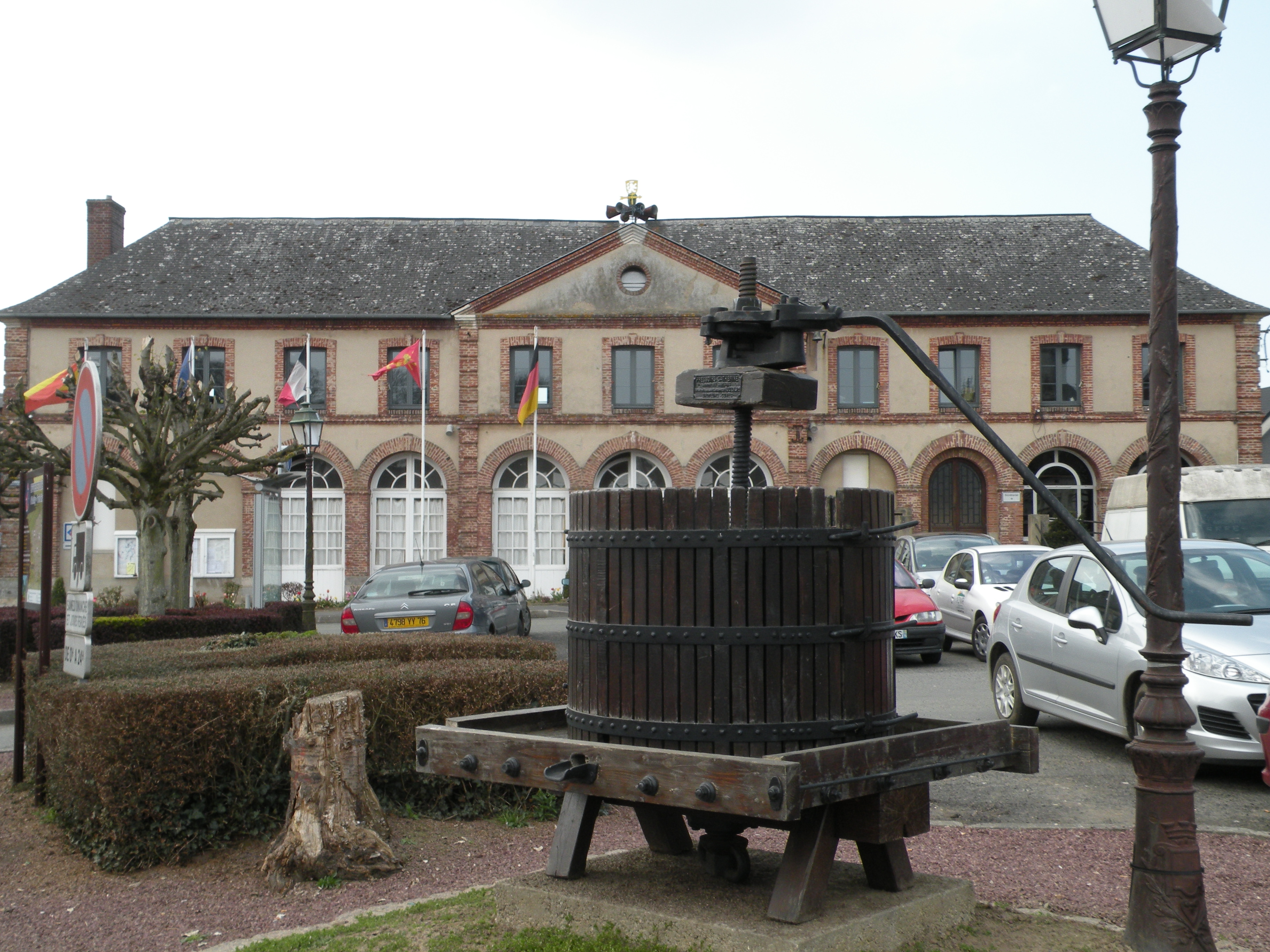
- The town hall in Tôtes

- Coat of arms
- Location of Tôtes
- Location within France Location within Normandy
- Coordinates: 49°40′46″N 1°02′52″E
- Country: France
- Region: Normandy
- Department: Seine-Maritime
- Arrondissement: Dieppe
- Canton: Luneray
- Intercommunality: CC Terroir de Caux

Government
  - Mayor (2020–2026): Jean-Yves Billoré
- Area^{1}: 7.61 km^{2} (2.94 sq mi)
- Elevation: 158 m (518 ft)
- Highest elevation: 172 m (564 ft)
- Lowest elevation: 138 m (453 ft)
- Population (2023): 1,564
  - Density: 206/km^{2} (532/sq mi)
- Time zone: UTC+01:00 (CET)
  - Summer (DST): UTC+02:00 (CEST)
- INSEE/Postal code: 76700 /76890
- ^{1} French Land Register data, which excludes lakes, ponds, glaciers > 1 km^{2} (0.386 sq mi or 247 acres) and river estuaries.

Tôtes (French pronunciation: [tot]) is a commune in the Seine-Maritime department in the Normandy region in north-western France.

== Geography ==
A farming small market town situated in the Pays de Caux, some 19 miles (31 km) south of Dieppe at the junction of the D 927 and the D 929 roads, formerly route nationale 27 and route nationale 29. Prior to the construction of the autoroute system, it was a strategically important crossroads.

== Heraldry ==
Arms of Tôtes	The arms of Tôtes are blazoned : Per pale 1: Gules, 3 geese argent and 2: per fess Or and azure, 3 hammers reversed gules and 3 crosslets argent; overall an inescutcheon Or, on a chief azure, 3 mullets of 5 Or.

== Population ==
Historical population
Year	Pop.	±% p.a.
1968	819	—
1975	848	+0.50%
1982	956	+1.73%
1990	1,059	+1.29%
1999	1,084	+0.26%
2007	1,308	+2.38%
2012	1,483	+2.54%
2017	1,559	+1.00%
2023	1,564	+0.05%
Source: INSEE

== Places of interest ==
- The church, dating from the nineteenth century.
- The nineteenth century château.
- The Auberge du Cygne, an inn and staging post of the 15th century.

== People ==
- Guy de Maupassant and Gustave Flaubert, French writers, stayed regularly at the inn
- Bernard Monnereau (born 1935), Olympic rower (born in Tôtes)

== Twin towns ==
- Bleckede, Germany, since 1977.
- Monreal del Campo, Spain

== See also ==
- The Auberge du Cygnes(in French)
- Communes of the Seine-Maritime department
