= Vassonville =

- Commune
- Location of Vassonville
- Location within France Location within Normandy
- Coordinates: 49°41′44″N 1°05′37″E
- Country: France
- Region: Normandy
- Department: Seine-Maritime
- Arrondissement: Dieppe
- Canton: Luneray
- Intercommunality: CC Terroir de Caux

Government
  - Mayor (2026–32): Éric Lerond
- Area^{1}: 5.65 km^{2} (2.18 sq mi)
- Elevation: 110 m (360 ft)
- Highest elevation: 162 m (531 ft)
- Lowest elevation: 99 m (325 ft)
- Population (2023): 412
  - Density: 72.9/km^{2} (189/sq mi)
- Time zone: UTC+01:00 (CET)
  - Summer (DST): UTC+02:00 (CEST)
- INSEE/Postal code: 76723 /76890
- ^{1} French Land Register data, which excludes lakes, ponds, glaciers > 1 km^{2} (0.386 sq mi or 247 acres) and river estuaries.

Vassonville (French pronunciation: [vasɔ̃vil]) is a commune in the Seine-Maritime department in the Normandy region in north-western France.

== Geography ==
A farming village situated by the banks of the river Scie in the Pays de Caux, some 19 miles (31 km) south of Dieppe on the D 57 road.

== Population ==
Historical population

Year	Pop.	±% p.a.
1793	350	—
1821	354	+0.04%
1846	362	+0.09%
1872	331	−0.34%
1901	325	−0.06%
1926	308	−0.21%
1946	344	+0.55%
1962	332	−0.22%
1968	294	−2.01%

Year	Pop.	±% p.a.
1975	272	−1.10%
1982	277	+0.26%
1990	307	+1.29%
1999	329	+0.77%
2007	387	+2.05%
2012	414	+1.36%
2017	455	+1.91%
2023	412	−1.64%

Source: EHESS and INSEE (1968-2023)

== Places of interest ==
- The church of St. Pierre, dating from the eleventh century.

== See also ==
- Communes of the Seine-Maritime department
