= Notre-Dame-du-Parc =

- Commune
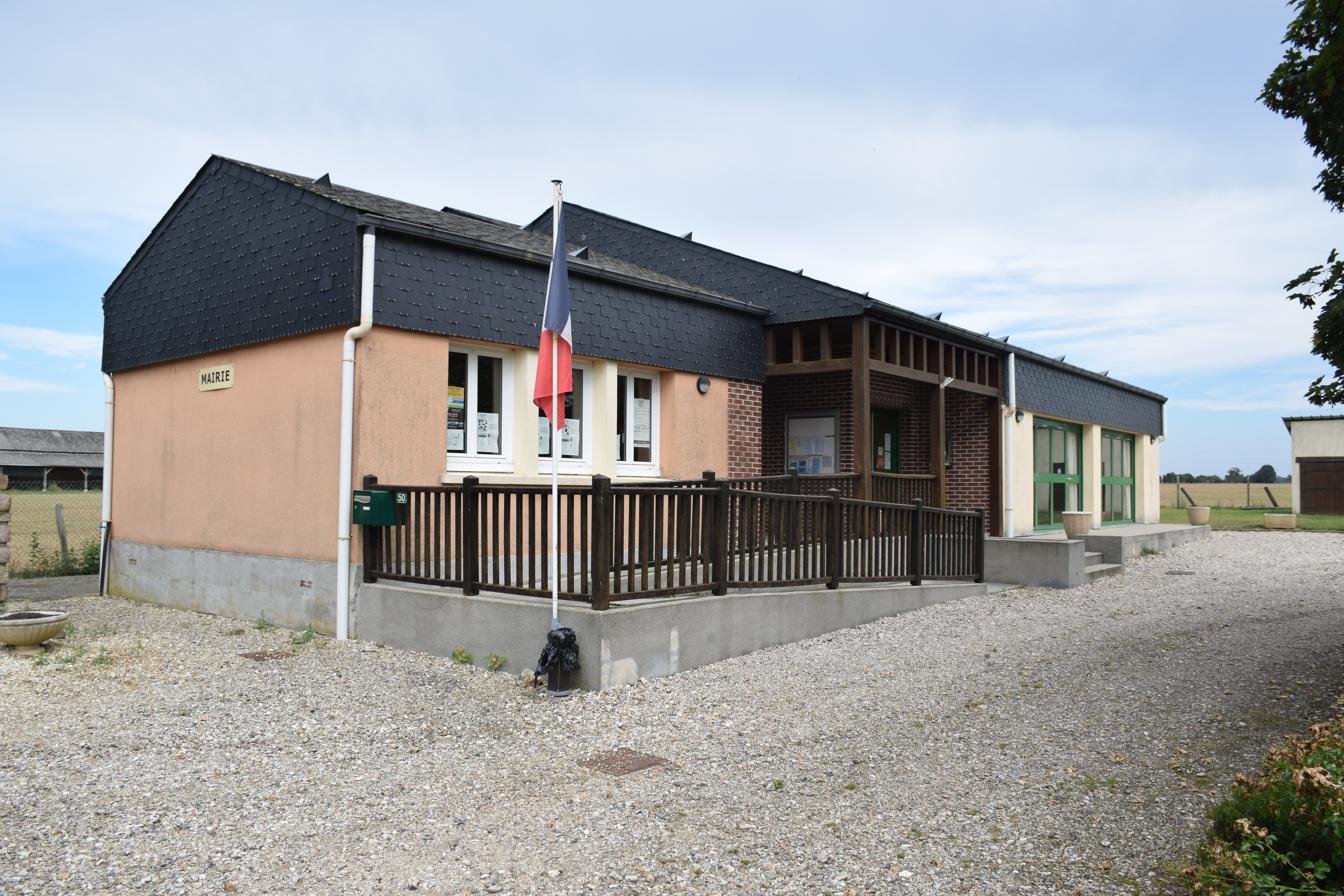
- The town hall in Notre-Dame-du-Parc

- Coat of arms
- Location of Notre-Dame-du-Parc
- Location within France Location within Normandy
- Coordinates: 49°44′47″N 1°07′33″E
- Country: France
- Region: Normandy
- Department: Seine-Maritime
- Arrondissement: Dieppe
- Canton: Luneray
- Intercommunality: CC Terroir de Caux

Government
  - Mayor (2026–32): Jérôme Vincent
- Area^{1}: 3.01 km^{2} (1.16 sq mi)
- Elevation: 130 m (430 ft)
- Highest elevation: 148 m (486 ft)
- Lowest elevation: 71 m (233 ft)
- Population (2023): 180
  - Density: 60/km^{2} (150/sq mi)
- Time zone: UTC+01:00 (CET)
  - Summer (DST): UTC+02:00 (CEST)
- INSEE/Postal code: 76478 /76590
- ^{1} French Land Register data, which excludes lakes, ponds, glaciers > 1 km^{2} (0.386 sq mi or 247 acres) and river estuaries.

Notre-Dame-du-Parc is a commune in the Seine-Maritime department in the Normandy region in northern France.

== Geography ==
A small farming village situated by the banks of the river Scie in the Pays de Caux at the junction of the D3 and the D76 roads, some 11 miles (18 km) south of Dieppe .

== Population ==
Historical population
Year	Pop.	±% p.a.
1968	123	—
1975	115	−0.96%
1982	132	+1.99%
1990	130	−0.19%
1999	128	−0.17%
2007	157	+2.59%
2012	158	+0.13%
2017	172	+1.71%
2023	180	+0.76%
Source: INSEE

== Places of interest ==
- The church of Notre-Dame, dating from the nineteenth century.

== See also ==
- Communes of the Seine-Maritime department
