= La Fontelaye =

- Commune
- Location of La Fontelaye
- Location within France Location within Normandy
- Coordinates: 49°41′49″N 0°57′14″E
- Country: France
- Region: Normandy
- Department: Seine-Maritime
- Arrondissement: Dieppe
- Canton: Luneray
- Intercommunality: CC Terroir de Caux

Government
  - Mayor (2020–2026): Caroline Dupuy
- Area^{1}: 3.99 km^{2} (1.54 sq mi)
- Elevation: 97 m (318 ft)
- Highest elevation: 157 m (515 ft)
- Lowest elevation: 91 m (299 ft)
- Population (2023): 27
  - Density: 6.8/km^{2} (18/sq mi)
- Time zone: UTC+01:00 (CET)
  - Summer (DST): UTC+02:00 (CEST)
- INSEE/Postal code: 76274 /76890
- ^{1} French Land Register data, which excludes lakes, ponds, glaciers > 1 km^{2} (0.386 sq mi or 247 acres) and river estuaries.

La Fontelaye (French pronunciation: [la fɔ̃tlɛ]) is a commune in the Seine-Maritime department in the Normandy region in northern France.

== Geography ==
A very small farming village situated by the banks of the Saâne river in the Pays de Caux, some 21 miles (34 km) south of Dieppe at the junction of the D303 and the D23 roads.

== Population ==
Historical population
Year	Pop.	±% p.a.
1968	51	—
1975	44	−2.09%
1982	38	−2.07%
1990	39	+0.33%
1999	40	+0.28%
2007	33	−2.38%
2012	34	+0.60%
2017	31	−1.83%
2023	27	−2.28%
Source: INSEE

== Places of interest ==
- A seventeenth century château built on the ruins of an earlier castle.
- The church of St.Martin, dating from the thirteenth century.

== See also ==
- Communes of the Seine-Maritime department
