= Les Cent-Acres =

- Commune
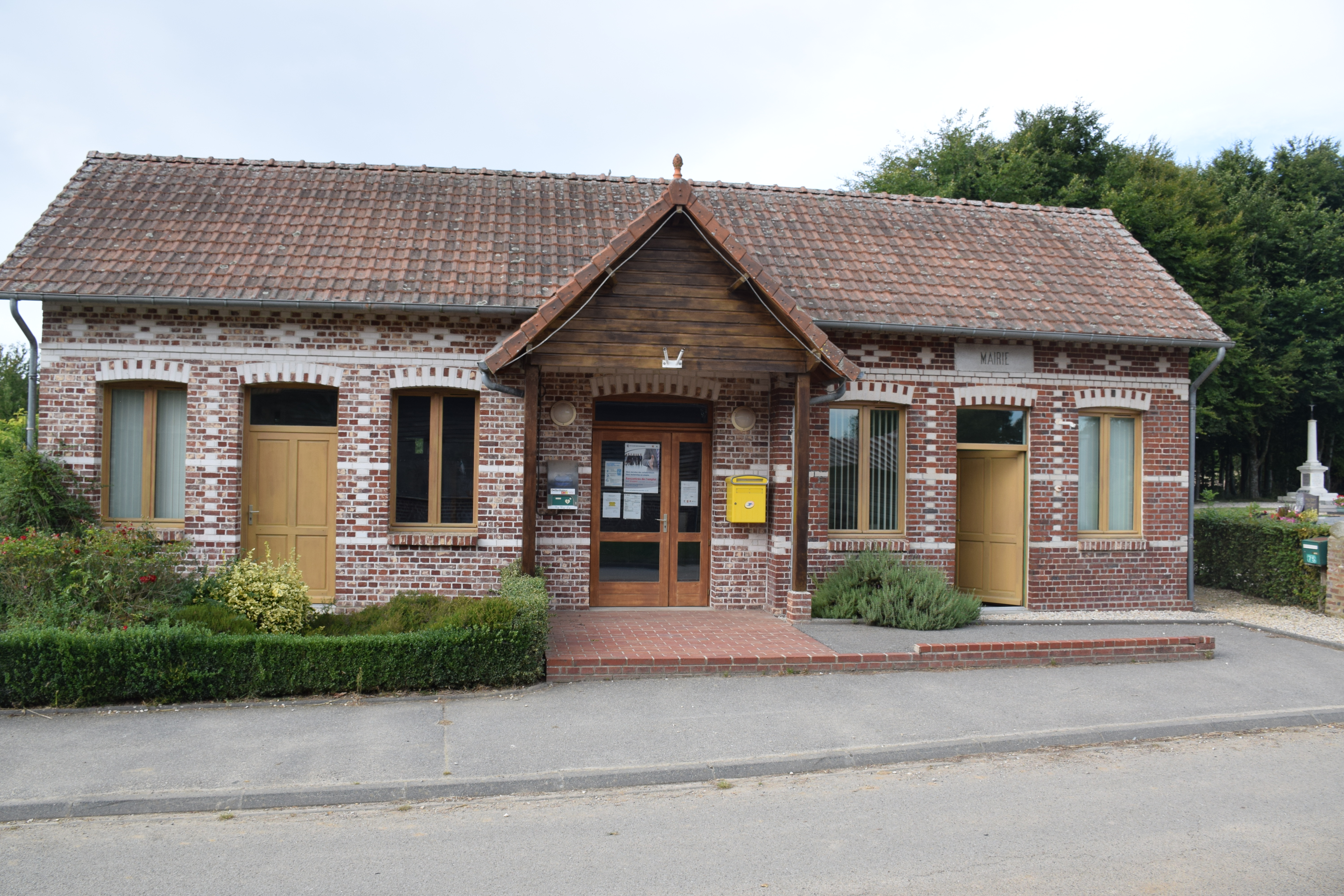
- The town hall in Les Cents-Acres
- Location of Les Cent-Acres
- Location within France Location within Normandy
- Coordinates: 49°46′04″N 1°08′32″E
- Country: France
- Region: Normandy
- Department: Seine-Maritime
- Arrondissement: Dieppe
- Canton: Luneray
- Intercommunality: CC Terroir de Caux

Government
  - Mayor (2026–32): Pascal Carpentier
- Area^{1}: 5.08 km^{2} (1.96 sq mi)
- Elevation: 150 m (490 ft)
- Highest elevation: 166 m (545 ft)
- Lowest elevation: 70 m (230 ft)
- Population (2023): 65
  - Density: 13/km^{2} (33/sq mi)
- Time zone: UTC+01:00 (CET)
  - Summer (DST): UTC+02:00 (CEST)
- INSEE/Postal code: 76168 /76590
- ^{1} French Land Register data, which excludes lakes, ponds, glaciers > 1 km^{2} (0.386 sq mi or 247 acres) and river estuaries.

Les Cent-Acres is a commune in the Seine-Maritime department in the Normandy region in northern France.

== Geography ==
A tiny farming village situated by the banks of the river Scie in the Pays de Caux, some 15 miles (24 km) south of Dieppe near the junction of the D77 and the D100 roads.

== Population ==
Historical population
Year	Pop.	±% p.a.
1968	68	—
1975	51	−4.03%
1982	48	−0.86%
1990	44	−1.08%
1999	39	−1.33%
2007	38	−0.32%
2012	50	+5.64%
2017	64	+5.06%
2023	65	+0.26%
Source: INSEE

== Places of interest ==
- The chateau de Montigny, dating from the seventeenth century.
- The chapel of Notre-Dame.

== See also ==
- Communes of the Seine-Maritime department
