= Val-de-Saâne =

- Commune
- Coat of arms
- Location of Val-de-Saâne
- Location within France Location within Normandy
- Coordinates: 49°42′19″N 0°57′55″E
- Country: France
- Region: Normandy
- Department: Seine-Maritime
- Arrondissement: Dieppe
- Canton: Luneray
- Intercommunality: CC Terroir de Caux

Government
  - Mayor (2026–32): Gilles Paumier
- Area^{1}: 13.87 km^{2} (5.36 sq mi)
- Elevation: 144 m (472 ft)
- Highest elevation: 158 m (518 ft)
- Lowest elevation: 70 m (230 ft)
- Population (2023): 1,454
  - Density: 104.8/km^{2} (271.5/sq mi)
- Time zone: UTC+01:00 (CET)
  - Summer (DST): UTC+02:00 (CEST)
- INSEE/Postal code: 76018 /76890
- ^{1} French Land Register data, which excludes lakes, ponds, glaciers > 1 km^{2} (0.386 sq mi or 247 acres) and river estuaries.

Val-de-Saâne (French pronunciation: [val də san], literally Vale of Saâne) is a commune in the Seine-Maritime department in the Normandy region in north-western France.

== Geography ==
A farming commune situated by the banks of the river Saâne in the Pays de Caux, some 19 miles (31 km) south of Dieppe at the junction of the D2, D25 and the D23 roads. The commune was created in 1964 by the fusion of the four villages of Anglesqueville-sur-Saâne, Eurville, Thiédeville and Varvannes.

== Heraldry ==
Arms of Val-de-Saâne	The arms of the commune of Val-de-Saâne are blazoned : Gules, on a cross Or between 2 fleurs-de-lys, an escallop and a rose argent, an inescutcheon vert charged with a cock Or.

== Population ==
Historical population
Year	Pop.	±% p.a.
1968	707	—
1975	1,027	+5.48%
1982	1,214	+2.42%
1990	1,257	+0.44%
1999	1,330	+0.63%
2007	1,341	+0.10%
2012	1,460	+1.71%
2017	1,504	+0.60%
2023	1,454	−0.56%
Source: INSEE

== Places of interest ==
- The church of St. Wandrille, dating from the eleventh century.
- The church of St. Sulpice, dating from the nineteenth century.
- The church of St. Nicaise, dating from the eleventh century.
- The church of St. Pierre at Eurville.
- The sixteenth-century château of Varvannes.

== See also ==
- Communes of the Seine-Maritime department
