= Biville-la-Baignarde =

- Commune
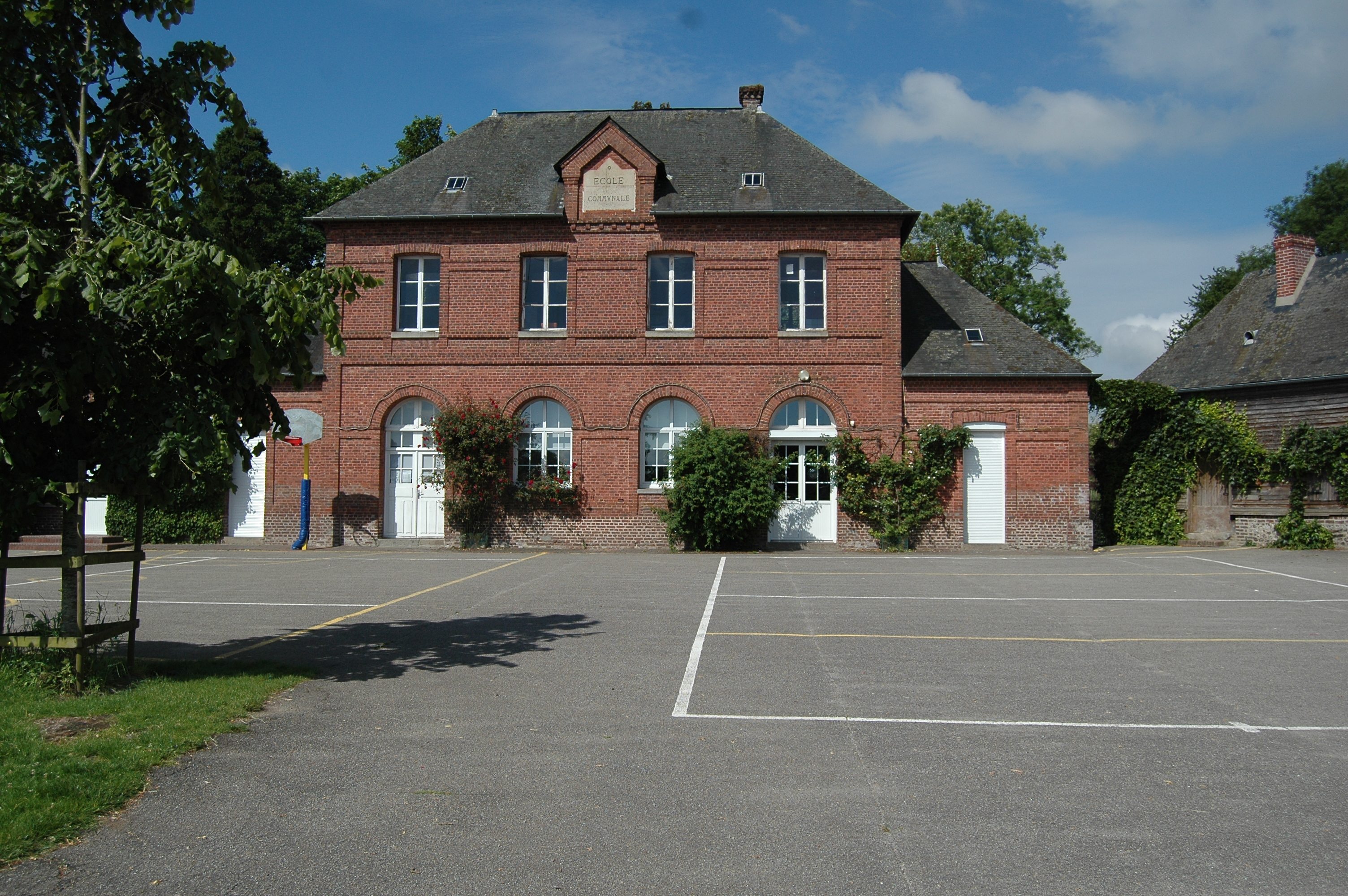
- The town hall in Biville-la-Baignarde

- Coat of arms
- Location of Biville-la-Baignarde
- Location within France Location within Normandy
- Coordinates: 49°43′19″N 1°02′56″E
- Country: France
- Region: Normandy
- Department: Seine-Maritime
- Arrondissement: Dieppe
- Canton: Luneray
- Intercommunality: CC Terroir de Caux

Government
  - Mayor (2020–2026): Jean-Marie Tabesse
- Area^{1}: 7.08 km^{2} (2.73 sq mi)
- Elevation: 134 m (440 ft)
- Highest elevation: 151 m (495 ft)
- Lowest elevation: 105 m (344 ft)
- Population (2023): 661
  - Density: 93.4/km^{2} (242/sq mi)
- Time zone: UTC+01:00 (CET)
  - Summer (DST): UTC+02:00 (CEST)
- INSEE/Postal code: 76096 /76890
- ^{1} French Land Register data, which excludes lakes, ponds, glaciers > 1 km^{2} (0.386 sq mi or 247 acres) and river estuaries.

Biville-la-Baignarde (French pronunciation: [bivil la bɛɲaʁd]) is a commune in the Seine-Maritime department in the Normandy region in northern France.

== Geography ==
A small farming village in the Pays de Caux, situated some 16 miles (26 km) south of Dieppe, near the junction of the D927 and the D353 roads.

== Heraldry ==
Arms of Biville-la-Baignarde	The arms of Biville-la-Baignarde are blazoned : Gules, a column on a pedestal argent charged with the capital letters RF sable and supporting a bust of Marianne argent, chapé Or charged with a horseshoe gules nailed sable and a spur rowel (mullet of 6 pierced) gules.

== Population ==
Historical population
Year	Pop.	±% p.a.
1968	542	—
1975	560	+0.47%
1982	568	+0.20%
1990	548	−0.45%
1999	514	−0.71%
2007	572	+1.35%
2012	647	+2.49%
2017	656	+0.28%
2023	661	+0.13%
Source: INSEE

== Places of interest ==
- The church of St.Paër, dating from the sixteenth century.
- The eighteenth century chapel of St.Leonard.
- The statue of Marianne on the square.

== See also ==
- Communes of the Seine-Maritime department
