= Torcy-le-Petit, Seine-Maritime =

Torcy-le-Petit
- Commune
- Coat of arms
- Location of Torcy-le-Petit
- Location within France Location within Normandy
- Coordinates: 49°48′50″N 1°10′27″E
- Country: France
- Region: Normandy
- Department: Seine-Maritime
- Arrondissement: Dieppe
- Canton: Luneray
- Intercommunality: CC Terroir de Caux

Government
  - Mayor (2026–32): Éric Béranger
- Area^{1}: 3.66 km^{2} (1.41 sq mi)
- Elevation: 38 m (125 ft)
- Highest elevation: 150 m (490 ft)
- Lowest elevation: 22 m (72 ft)
- Population (2023): 518
  - Density: 142/km^{2} (367/sq mi)
- Time zone: UTC+01:00 (CET)
  - Summer (DST): UTC+02:00 (CEST)
- INSEE/Postal code: 76698 /76590
- ^{1} French Land Register data, which excludes lakes, ponds, glaciers > 1 km^{2} (0.386 sq mi or 247 acres) and river estuaries.

Torcy-le-Petit (French pronunciation: [tɔʁsi lə pəti]) is a commune in the Seine-Maritime department in the Normandy region in north-western France.

== Geography ==
A farming village situated in the Pays de Caux and by the banks of the river Varenne, some 7 miles (11 km) south of Dieppe at the junction of the D 915 and the D 149 roads.

== Heraldry ==
Arms of Torcy-le-Petit	The arms of Torcy-le-Petit are blazoned : Azure, a chevron Or between 3 martlets argent.

== Population ==
Historical population
Year	Pop.	±% p.a.
1968	521	—
1975	511	−0.28%
1982	442	−2.05%
1990	491	+1.32%
1999	474	−0.39%
2007	471	−0.08%
2012	507	+1.48%
2017	485	−0.88%
2023	518	+1.10%
Source: INSEE

== Places of interest ==
- The church of St. Denis, dating from the thirteenth century.

== See also ==
- Communes of the Seine-Maritime department
