= Étaimpuis =

- Commune
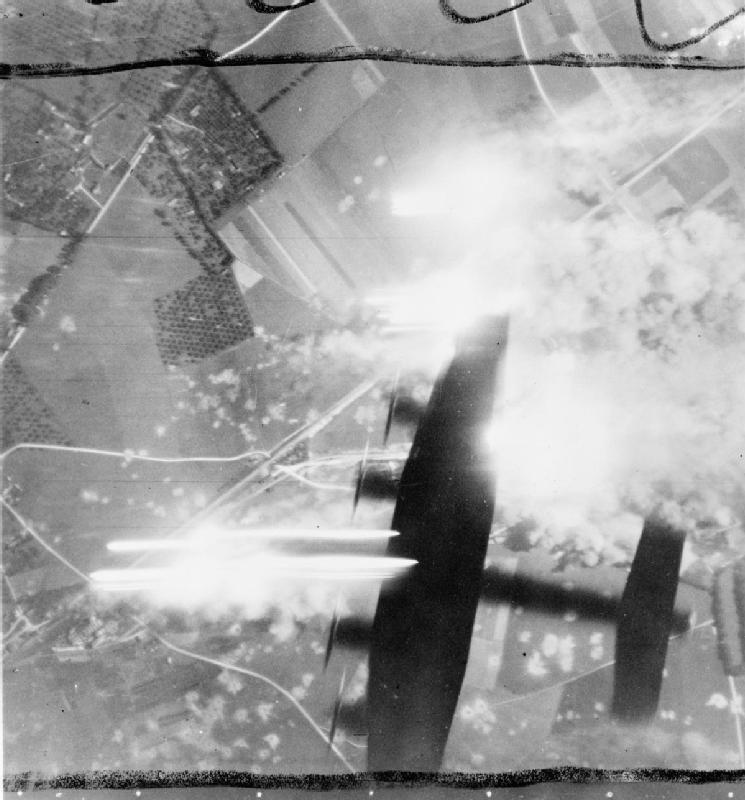
- An aerial view of Etaimpuis-Biennais, during World War II
- Location of Étaimpuis
- Location within France Location within Normandy
- Coordinates: 49°38′48″N 1°08′41″E
- Country: France
- Region: Normandy
- Department: Seine-Maritime
- Arrondissement: Dieppe
- Canton: Luneray
- Intercommunality: CC Terroir de Caux

Government
  - Mayor (2020–2026): Jean-Claude Lebret
- Area^{1}: 10.6 km^{2} (4.1 sq mi)
- Elevation: 150 m (490 ft)
- Highest elevation: 171 m (561 ft)
- Lowest elevation: 132 m (433 ft)
- Population (2023): 880
  - Density: 83/km^{2} (220/sq mi)
- Time zone: UTC+01:00 (CET)
  - Summer (DST): UTC+02:00 (CEST)
- INSEE/Postal code: 76249 /76850
- ^{1} French Land Register data, which excludes lakes, ponds, glaciers > 1 km^{2} (0.386 sq mi or 247 acres) and river estuaries.

Étaimpuis is a commune in the Seine-Maritime department in the Normandy region in northern France.

== Geography ==
A farming commune consisting of several villages and hamlets situated in the Pays de Caux, some 20 miles (32 km) south of Dieppe at the junction of the D57, D100 and the D225 roads. The A29 autoroute crosses the southern part of the commune's territory.

== History ==
The commune was formed in 1824 by the merger of the 3 former parishes of Biennais, Étaimpuis and Leuilly.

== Population ==
Historical population
Year	Pop.	±% p.a.
1968	388	—
1975	405	+0.61%
1982	508	+3.29%
1990	550	+1.00%
1999	523	−0.56%
2007	665	+3.05%
2012	740	+2.16%
2017	805	+1.70%
2023	880	+1.50%
Source: INSEE

== Places of interest ==
- The church of St.Martin at Étaimpuis, dating from the nineteenth century.
- The church of St.Martin at Biennais, dating from the seventeenth century.

== See also ==
- Communes of the Seine-Maritime department
