= Route nationale 27 =

Road in Normandy, France

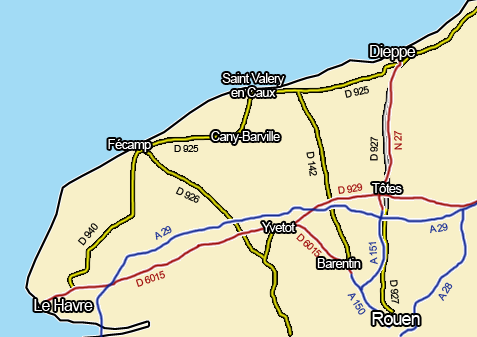
Map depicting route nationale 27

The Route nationale 27 is a highway in Normandy, north west France. It connects the city of Rouen to the port of Dieppe.

== Route ==
The road starts with a junction on the Route de Dieppe (D 6015, former N 14) in the town of Notre-Dame-de-Bondeville north-west of Rouen. The road heads north through Malaunay. Through traffic now is routed along the A151 autoroute. The road crosses the A29 autoroute and then joins the A151 which becomes the N 27 although it remains autoroute standard. It passes to the west of the town of Tôtes. After Catteville the road becomes single carriageway. At the entrance of Saint-Aubin-sur-Scie, through traffic branches off on the D 54^{B} to the port, the old N27 takes a loop alongside the river Scie and into Dieppe.
