= Varenne (Arques) =

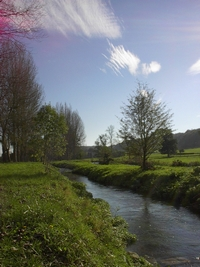

- Location within France Location within Normandy

Location
- Country: France

Physical characteristics
- Source
  - location: Montérolier
- Mouth
  - location: Arques
  - coordinates: 49°53′30″N 1°7′50″E
- Length: 39 km (24 mi)
- Basin size: 345 km^{2} (133 sq mi)
- Discharge
  - average: 3.5 m^{3}/s (120 cu ft/s)

Basin features
- Progression: Arques→ English Channel

The Varenne (French pronunciation: [vaʁɛn]) is a river of Normandy, France, 39 kilometres (24 mi) in length, flowing through the department of Seine-Maritime. It is a tributary of the river Arques. The river is the ultimate source of the surname and given name Warren, via William de Warenne of Bellencombre castle, his hereditary seat. de Warenne was a companion of William the Conqueror and made first Earl of Surrey in 1088 as reward for his service during the Norman Conquest.

== Geography ==
The river's source is just northwest of Buchy near to Montérolier, Its valley separates the pays de Caux on the west bank from the pays de Bray to the east. Of the three rivers that form the Arques, the Varenne is the shortest but paradoxically has the largest catchment area and highest speed (3.5 m/s). The only significant tributary is the Herring Creek (8 km in length) which joins on the left bank at Rosay.
Its course takes it past the communes of Saint-Martin-Osmonville, Saint-Saëns, through the forest of Eawy and on to Bellencombre, Saint-Hellier, Torcy-le-Grand, Torcy-le-Petit, Martigny, and finally Arques-la-Bataille where it joins the rivers Eaulne and Béthune to form the Arques.
Like other rivers in the region, the Varenne is classified as a first class river, offering anglers the chance to catch salmon and trout. The river is also used near its source, to supply the drinking water system.

== See also ==
- French water management scheme
