= Communauté de Communes Saâne et Vienne =

Coordinates: 49.7856°N 0.9974°E

Saâne et Vienne
- Former communauté de communes
- Interactive map of Saâne et Vienne
- Country: France
- Region: Normandy
- Department: Seine-Maritime
- No. of communes: {{{nbcomm}}}
- Established: 2002
- Disbanded: 2017

The Communauté de communes Saâne et Vienne (CCSV) is a former intercommunality in the Seine-Maritime département of the Normandy region of north-western France. It was created in January 2002. It was merged into the new Communauté de communes Terroir de Caux in January 2017.

== Participants ==
The Communauté de communes comprised the following communes:

- Ambrumesnil
- Auppegard
- Auzouville-sur-Saâne
- Avremesnil
- Bacqueville-en-Caux
- Biville-la-Rivière
- Brachy
- Gonnetot
- Greuville
- Gruchet-Saint-Siméon
- Gueures
- Hermanville
- Lamberville
- Lammerville
- Lestanville
- Longueil
- Luneray
- Omonville
- Ouville-la-Rivière
- Quiberville
- Rainfreville
- Royville
- Saâne-Saint-Just
- Saint-Denis-d'Aclon
- Saint-Mards
- Saint-Ouen-le-Mauger
- Saint-Pierre-Bénouville
- Sassetot-le-Malgardé
- Thil-Manneville
- Tocqueville-en-Caux
- Vénestanville

== See also ==
- Communes of the Seine-Maritime department
