= Canton of Bacqueville-en-Caux =

Coordinates: 49°47′36″N 0°57′07″E

Bacqueville-en-Caux
- Former canton
- Interactive map of Bacqueville-en-Caux
- Country: France
- Region: Normandy
- Department: Seine-Maritime
- No. of communes: {{{nbcomm}}}
- Disbanded: 2015
- Area: 127.55 km^{2} (49.25 sq mi)
- Population (2012): 11,466
  - Density: 89.894/km^{2} (232.82/sq mi)

The Canton of Bacqueville-en-Caux is a former canton situated in the Seine-Maritime département and in the Haute-Normandie region of northern France. It was disbanded following the French canton reorganisation which came into effect in March 2015. It consisted of 25 communes, which joined the new canton of Luneray in 2015. It had a total of 11,466 inhabitants (2012).

== Geography ==
A farming area in the arrondissement of Dieppe, centred on the town of Bacqueville-en-Caux. The altitude varies from 11m (Avremesnil) to 146m (Auzouville-sur-Saâne with an average altitude of 83m.

The canton comprised 25 communes:

- Auppegard
- Auzouville-sur-Saâne
- Avremesnil
- Bacqueville-en-Caux
- Biville-la-Rivière
- Brachy
- Gonnetot
- Greuville
- Gruchet-Saint-Siméon
- Gueures
- Hermanville
- Lamberville
- Lammerville
- Lestanville
- Luneray
- Omonville
- Rainfreville
- Royville
- Saâne-Saint-Just
- Saint-Mards
- Saint-Ouen-le-Mauger
- Sassetot-le-Malgardé
- Thil-Manneville
- Tocqueville-en-Caux
- Vénestanville

== Population ==
Historical population Canton of Bacqueville-en-Caux
Year	1962	1968	1975	1982	1990	1999
Pop.	9,048	9,795	9,461	9,925	10,187	10,375
±%	—	+8.3%	−3.4%	+4.9%	+2.6%	+1.8%
From the year 1962 on: No double counting – residents of multiple communes (e.g. students and military personnel) are counted only once. Source: INSEE

== See also ==
- Arrondissements of the Seine-Maritime department
- Cantons of the Seine-Maritime department
- Communes of the Seine-Maritime department
