= Hermanville =

Hermanville may refer to the following places:

France

- Hermanville-sur-Mer, in Calvados, Basse-Normandie
- Hermanville, Seine-Maritime in Seine-Maritime, Haute-Normandie

United States

- Hermanville, Mississippi, in Claiborne County
