= Belmesnil =

- Commune
- Location of Belmesnil
- Location within France Location within Normandy
- Coordinates: 49°46′13″N 1°02′57″E
- Country: France
- Region: Normandy
- Department: Seine-Maritime
- Arrondissement: Dieppe
- Canton: Luneray
- Intercommunality: CC Terroir de Caux

Government
  - Mayor (2026–32): Guy Le Verdier
- Area^{1}: 3.03 km^{2} (1.17 sq mi)
- Elevation: 126 m (413 ft)
- Highest elevation: 127 m (417 ft)
- Lowest elevation: 106 m (348 ft)
- Population (2023): 440
  - Density: 150/km^{2} (380/sq mi)
- Time zone: UTC+01:00 (CET)
  - Summer (DST): UTC+02:00 (CEST)
- INSEE/Postal code: 76075 /76590
- ^{1} French Land Register data, which excludes lakes, ponds, glaciers > 1 km^{2} (0.386 sq mi or 247 acres) and river estuaries.

Belmesnil (French pronunciation: [bɛlmenil]) is a commune in the Seine-Maritime department in the Normandy region in northern France.

== Geography ==
A farming village in the Pays de Caux, situated some 13 miles (21 km) south of Dieppe, at the junction of the D76 and D927 roads.

== Population ==
Historical population
Year	Pop.	±% p.a.
1968	341	—
1975	328	−0.55%
1982	381	+2.16%
1990	427	+1.44%
1999	432	+0.13%
2007	498	+1.79%
2012	480	−0.73%
2017	457	−0.98%
2023	440	−0.63%
Source: INSEE

== Places of interest ==
- The church of St.Remy, dating from the sixteenth century.
- Remains of a World War II V-1 launch site.

== See also ==
- Communes of the Seine-Maritime department
