= Communauté de communes Terroir de Caux =

Federation of municipalities in France

Terroir de Caux
- Communauté de communes
- Interactive map of Terroir de Caux
- Coordinates: 49°47′N 01°00′E
- Country: France
- Region: Normandy
- Department: Seine-Maritime
- No. of communes: {{{nbcomm}}}
- Established: 2017
- Area: 489.3 km^{2} (188.9 sq mi)
- Population (2019): 37,872
  - Density: 77.40/km^{2} (200.5/sq mi)

The Communauté de communes Terroir de Caux is a communauté de communes in the Seine-Maritime département and in the Normandy région of France. It was formed on 1 January 2017 by the merger of the former Communauté de communes des Trois Rivières, Communauté de Communes Saâne et Vienne, Communauté de communes de Varenne et Scie and 3 communes from the former Communauté de communes du Bosc d'Eawy on 1 January 2017. Its seat is in Bacqueville-en-Caux. Its area is 489.3 km^{2}, and its population was 37,872 in 2019.

== Composition ==
The communauté de communes consists of the following 79 communes:

1. Ambrumesnil
2. Anneville-sur-Scie
3. Auppegard
4. Auzouville-sur-Saâne
5. Avremesnil
6. Bacqueville-en-Caux
7. Beautot
8. Beauval-en-Caux
9. Belleville-en-Caux
10. Belmesnil
11. Bertreville-Saint-Ouen
12. Bertrimont
13. Biville-la-Baignarde
14. Biville-la-Rivière
15. Le Bois-Robert
16. Brachy
17. Bracquetuit
18. Calleville-les-Deux-Églises
19. Le Catelier
20. Les Cent-Acres
21. La Chapelle-du-Bourgay
22. La Chaussée
23. Criquetot-sur-Longueville
24. Cropus
25. Crosville-sur-Scie
26. Dénestanville
27. Étaimpuis
28. La Fontelaye
29. Fresnay-le-Long
30. Gonnetot
31. Gonneville-sur-Scie
32. Greuville
33. Gruchet-Saint-Siméon
34. Gueures
35. Gueutteville
36. Hermanville
37. Heugleville-sur-Scie
38. Imbleville
39. Lamberville
40. Lammerville
41. Lestanville
42. Lintot-les-Bois
43. Longueil
44. Longueville-sur-Scie
45. Luneray
46. Manéhouville
47. Montreuil-en-Caux
48. Muchedent
49. Notre-Dame-du-Parc
50. Omonville
51. Ouville-la-Rivière
52. Quiberville
53. Rainfreville
54. Royville
55. Saâne-Saint-Just
56. Saint-Crespin
57. Saint-Denis-d'Aclon
58. Saint-Denis-sur-Scie
59. Sainte-Foy
60. Saint-Germain-d'Étables
61. Saint-Honoré
62. Saint-Maclou-de-Folleville
63. Saint-Mards
64. Saint-Ouen-du-Breuil
65. Saint-Ouen-le-Mauger
66. Saint-Pierre-Bénouville
67. Saint-Vaast-du-Val
68. Saint-Victor-l'Abbaye
69. Sassetot-le-Malgardé
70. Thil-Manneville
71. Tocqueville-en-Caux
72. Torcy-le-Grand
73. Torcy-le-Petit
74. Tôtes
75. Val-de-Saâne
76. Val-de-Scie
77. Varneville-Bretteville
78. Vassonville
79. Vénestanville
