= Cropus =

- Commune
- Location of Cropus
- Location within France Location within Normandy
- Coordinates: 49°44′27″N 1°08′52″E
- Country: France
- Region: Normandy
- Department: Seine-Maritime
- Arrondissement: Dieppe
- Canton: Neufchâtel-en-Bray
- Intercommunality: CC Terroir de Caux

Government
  - Mayor (2026–32): Denis Quesnay
- Area^{1}: 4.78 km^{2} (1.85 sq mi)
- Elevation: 152 m (499 ft)
- Highest elevation: 162 m (531 ft)
- Lowest elevation: 109 m (358 ft)
- Population (2023): 248
  - Density: 51.9/km^{2} (134/sq mi)
- Time zone: UTC+01:00 (CET)
  - Summer (DST): UTC+02:00 (CEST)
- INSEE/Postal code: 76204 /76720
- ^{1} French Land Register data, which excludes lakes, ponds, glaciers > 1 km^{2} (0.386 sq mi or 247 acres) and river estuaries.

Cropus is a commune in the Seine-Maritime department in the Normandy region in northern France.

== Geography ==
A farming village situated in the Pays de Caux, some 20 miles (32 km) south of Dieppe, at the junction of the D100 and the D76 roads.

== Population ==
Historical population
Year	Pop.	±% p.a.
1968	247	—
1975	201	−2.90%
1982	176	−1.88%
1990	220	+2.83%
1999	214	−0.31%
2007	226	+0.68%
2012	249	+1.96%
2017	249	+0.00%
2023	248	−0.07%
Source: INSEE

== Places of interest ==
- The church of St.Jean, dating from the eighteenth century.
- The manorhouse of Bras Coupé.
- An old stone cross.

== See also ==
- Communes of the Seine-Maritime department
