= Lintot-les-Bois =

- Commune
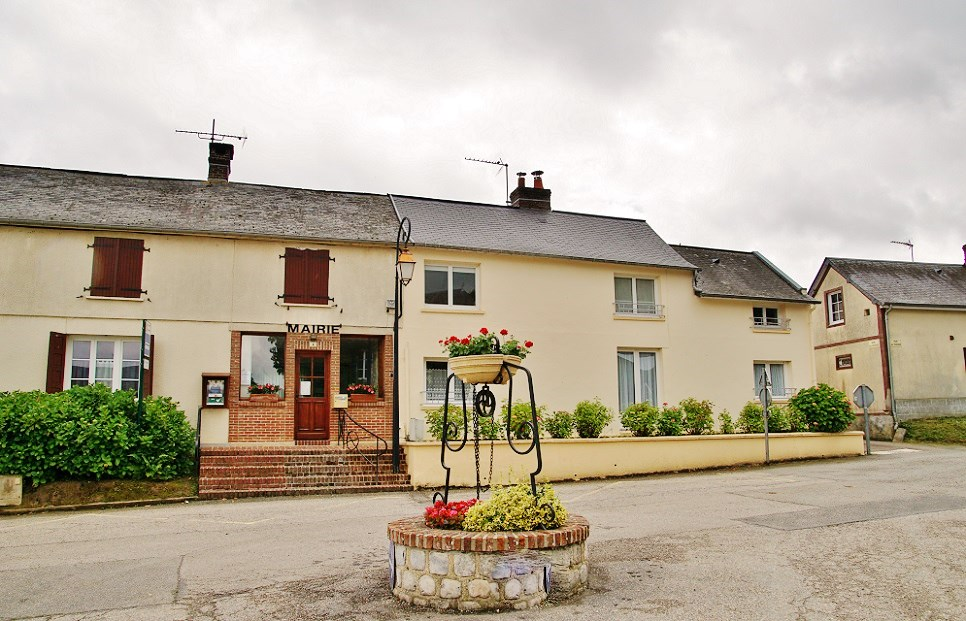
- The town hall in Lintot-les-Bois
- Location of Lintot-les-Bois
- Location within France Location within Normandy
- Coordinates: 49°48′01″N 1°04′26″E
- Country: France
- Region: Normandy
- Department: Seine-Maritime
- Arrondissement: Dieppe
- Canton: Luneray
- Intercommunality: CC Terroir de Caux

Government
  - Mayor (2026–32): Marie-Christine Levavasseur
- Area^{1}: 2.81 km^{2} (1.08 sq mi)
- Elevation: 110 m (360 ft)
- Highest elevation: 124 m (407 ft)
- Lowest elevation: 64 m (210 ft)
- Population (2023): 189
  - Density: 67.3/km^{2} (174/sq mi)
- Time zone: UTC+01:00 (CET)
  - Summer (DST): UTC+02:00 (CEST)
- INSEE/Postal code: 76389 /76590
- ^{1} French Land Register data, which excludes lakes, ponds, glaciers > 1 km^{2} (0.386 sq mi or 247 acres) and river estuaries.

Lintot-les-Bois (French pronunciation: [lɛ̃to le bwa]) is a commune in the Seine-Maritime department in the Normandy region in northern France.

== Geography ==
A small farming village situated in the Pays de Caux, some 9 miles (14 km) south of Dieppe at the junction of the D927 and the D107 roads.

== Population ==
Historical population
| Year | Pop. | ±% p.a. |
|---|---|---|
| 1968 | 154 | — |
| 1975 | 151 | −0.28% |
| 1982 | 174 | +2.05% |
| 1990 | 176 | +0.14% |
| 1999 | 151 | −1.69% |
| 2007 | 183 | +2.43% |
| 2012 | 190 | +0.75% |
| 2017 | 181 | −0.97% |
| 2023 | 189 | +0.72% |
Source: INSEE

== Places of interest ==
- The church of St.Nicholas, dating from the seventeenth century.
- An ancient stone cross.

== See also ==
- Communes of the Seine-Maritime department
