= Saint-Pierre-Bénouville =

- Commune
- Location of Saint-Pierre-Bénouville
- Location within France Location within Normandy
- Coordinates: 49°44′29″N 0°58′18″E
- Country: France
- Region: Normandy
- Department: Seine-Maritime
- Arrondissement: Dieppe
- Canton: Luneray
- Intercommunality: CC Terroir de Caux

Government
  - Mayor (2020–2026): Bernard Padé
- Area^{1}: 8.39 km^{2} (3.24 sq mi)
- Elevation: 130 m (430 ft)
- Highest elevation: 148 m (486 ft)
- Lowest elevation: 69 m (226 ft)
- Population (2023): 353
  - Density: 42.1/km^{2} (109/sq mi)
- Time zone: UTC+01:00 (CET)
  - Summer (DST): UTC+02:00 (CEST)
- INSEE/Postal code: 76632 /76890
- ^{1} French Land Register data, which excludes lakes, ponds, glaciers > 1 km^{2} (0.386 sq mi or 247 acres) and river estuaries.

Saint-Pierre-Bénouville (French pronunciation: [sɛ̃ pjɛʁ benuvil]) is a commune in the Seine-Maritime department in the Normandy region in north-western France.

== Geography ==
A farming village situated by the banks of the Saâne river in the Pays de Caux, at the junction of the D 101 and the D 55 roads, some 12 miles (19 km) south of Dieppe.

== Population ==
Historical population

Year	Pop.	±% p.a.
1793	301	—
1831	918	+2.98%
1896	483	−0.98%
1936	355	−0.77%
1962	327	−0.32%
1968	309	−0.94%
1975	284	−1.20%

Year	Pop.	±% p.a.
1982	336	+2.43%
1990	337	+0.04%
1999	326	−0.37%
2007	321	−0.19%
2012	345	+1.45%
2017	379	+1.90%
2023	353	−1.18%

Source: EHESS and INSEE

== Places of interest ==
- The church of St. Pierre, dating from the sixteenth century.
- The church of St. Étienne at Dracqueville, dating from the twelfth century.

== See also ==
- Communes of the Seine-Maritime department
