= Arrondissement of Dieppe =

Coordinates: 49.93°N 1.08°E

Dieppe
- Arrondissement
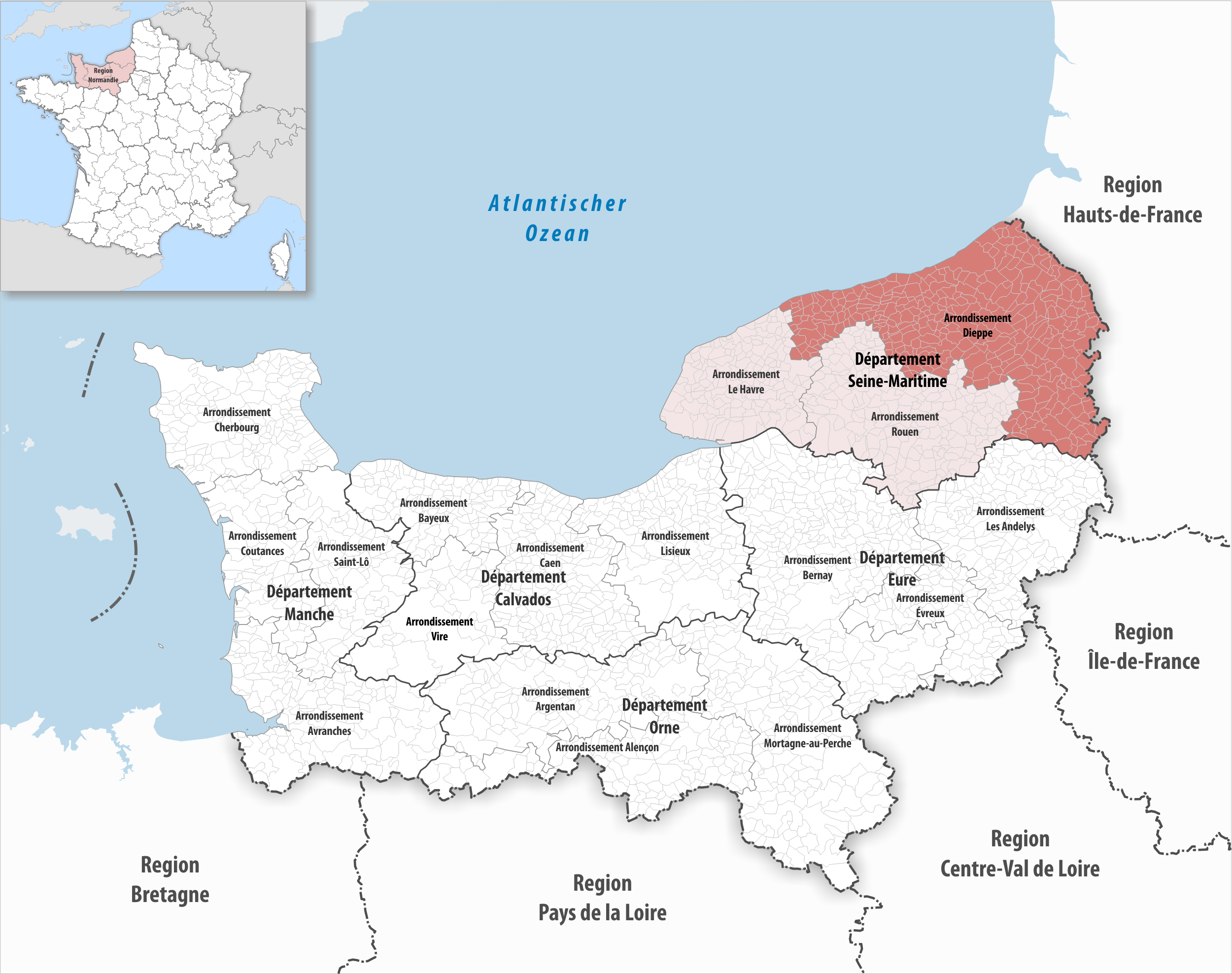
- Location within the region Normandy
- Country: France
- Region: Normandy
- Department: Seine-Maritime
- No. of communes: {{{nbcomm}}}
- Area: 3,120.1 km^{2} (1,204.7 sq mi)
- Population (2023): 231,061
  - Density: 74.056/km^{2} (191.80/sq mi)
- INSEE code: 761

The arrondissement of Dieppe is an arrondissement of France in the Seine-Maritime department in the Normandy région. It has 342 communes. Its population is 232,559 (2021), and its area is 3,120.1 km^{2} (1,204.7 sq mi).

== Composition ==
The communes of the arrondissement of Dieppe, and their INSEE codes, are:

1. Ambrumesnil (76004)
2. Ancourt (76008)
3. Ancourteville-sur-Héricourt (76009)
4. Angiens (76015)
5. Anglesqueville-la-Bras-Long (76016)
6. Anneville-sur-Scie (76019)
7. Ardouval (76024)
8. Argueil (76025)
9. Arques-la-Bataille (76026)
10. Aubéguimont (76028)
11. Aubermesnil-aux-Érables (76029)
12. Aubermesnil-Beaumais (76030)
13. Auberville-la-Manuel (76032)
14. Aumale (76035)
15. Auppegard (76036)
16. Autigny (76040)
17. Auvilliers (76042)
18. Auzouville-sur-Saâne (76047)
19. Avesnes-en-Bray (76048)
20. Avesnes-en-Val (76049)
21. Avremesnil (76050)
22. Bacqueville-en-Caux (76051)
23. Bailleul-Neuville (76052)
24. Baillolet (76053)
25. Bailly-en-Rivière (76054)
26. Baromesnil (76058)
27. Bazinval (76059)
28. Beaubec-la-Rosière (76060)
29. Beaussault (76065)
30. Beautot (76066)
31. Beauval-en-Caux (76063)
32. Beauvoir-en-Lyons (76067)
33. Bellencombre (76070)
34. Bellengreville (76071)
35. Belleville-en-Caux (76072)
36. La Bellière (76074)
37. Belmesnil (76075)
38. Bertheauville (76083)
39. Bertreville (76084)
40. Bertreville-Saint-Ouen (76085)
41. Bertrimont (76086)
42. Beuzeville-la-Guérard (76091)
43. Bézancourt (76093)
44. Biville-la-Baignarde (76096)
45. Biville-la-Rivière (76097)
46. Blangy-sur-Bresle (76101)
47. Blosseville (76104)
48. Le Bois-Robert (76112)
49. Bosc-Bérenger (76119)
50. Bosc-Hyons (76124)
51. Bosc-Mesnil (76126)
52. Bosville (76128)
53. Bouelles (76130)
54. Le Bourg-Dun (76133)
55. Bourville (76134)
56. Brachy (76136)
57. Bracquetuit (76138)
58. Bradiancourt (76139)
59. Brametot (76140)
60. Brémontier-Merval (76142)
61. Bully (76147)
62. Bures-en-Bray (76148)
63. Butot-Vénesville (76732)
64. Cailleville (76151)
65. Callengeville (76122)
66. Calleville-les-Deux-Églises (76153)
67. Campneuseville (76154)
68. Canehan (76155)
69. Canouville (76156)
70. Cany-Barville (76159)
71. Le Catelier (76162)
72. Le Caule-Sainte-Beuve (76166)
73. Les Cent-Acres (76168)
74. La Chapelle-du-Bourgay (76170)
75. La Chapelle-Saint-Ouen (76171)
76. La Chapelle-sur-Dun (76172)
77. La Chaussée (76173)
78. Clais (76175)
79. Clasville (76176)
80. Cleuville (76180)
81. Colmesnil-Manneville (76184)
82. Compainville (76185)
83. Conteville (76186)
84. Crasville-la-Mallet (76189)
85. Crasville-la-Rocquefort (76190)
86. Criel-sur-Mer (76192)
87. La Crique (76193)
88. Criquetot-sur-Longueville (76197)
89. Criquiers (76199)
90. Critot (76200)
91. Croisy-sur-Andelle (76201)
92. Croixdalle (76202)
93. Cropus (76204)
94. Crosville-sur-Scie (76205)
95. Cuverville-sur-Yères (76207)
96. Cuy-Saint-Fiacre (76208)
97. Dampierre-en-Bray (76209)
98. Dampierre-Saint-Nicolas (76210)
99. Dancourt (76211)
100. Dénestanville (76214)
101. Dieppe (76217)
102. Doudeauville (76218)
103. Douvrend (76220)
104. Drosay (76221)
105. Elbeuf-en-Bray (76229)
106. Ellecourt (76233)
107. Envermeu (76235)
108. Ermenouville (76241)
109. Ernemont-la-Villette (76242)
110. Esclavelles (76244)
111. Étaimpuis (76249)
112. Étalondes (76252)
113. Eu (76255)
114. Fallencourt (76257)
115. Ferrières-en-Bray (76260)
116. La Ferté-Saint-Samson (76261)
117. Fesques (76262)
118. La Feuillie (76263)
119. Flamets-Frétils (76265)
120. Flocques (76266)
121. Fontaine-en-Bray (76269)
122. Fontaine-le-Dun (76272)
123. La Fontelaye (76274)
124. Forges-les-Eaux (76276)
125. Foucarmont (76278)
126. Fréauville (76280)
127. Fresles (76283)
128. Fresnay-le-Long (76284)
129. Fresnoy-Folny (76286)
130. Freulleville (76288)
131. Fry (76292)
132. La Gaillarde (76294)
133. Gaillefontaine (76295)
134. Gancourt-Saint-Étienne (76297)
135. Gonnetot (76306)
136. Gonneville-sur-Scie (76308)
137. Gournay-en-Bray (76312)
138. Grainville-la-Teinturière (76315)
139. Grandcourt (76320)
140. Les Grandes-Ventes (76321)
141. Graval (76323)
142. Grèges (76324)
143. Greuville (76327)
144. Gruchet-Saint-Siméon (76330)
145. Grumesnil (76332)
146. Guerville (76333)
147. Gueures (76334)
148. Gueutteville (76335)
149. Gueutteville-les-Grès (76336)
150. La Hallotière (76338)
151. Le Hanouard (76339)
152. Haucourt (76343)
153. Haudricourt (76344)
154. Haussez (76345)
155. Hautot-l'Auvray (76346)
156. Hautot-sur-Mer (76349)
157. La Haye (76352)
158. Héberville (76353)
159. Hermanville (76356)
160. Heugleville-sur-Scie (76360)
161. Hodeng-au-Bosc (76363)
162. Hodeng-Hodenger (76364)
163. Houdetot (76365)
164. Les Ifs (76371)
165. Illois (76372)
166. Imbleville (76373)
167. Incheville (76374)
168. Ingouville (76375)
169. Lamberville (76379)
170. Lammerville (76380)
171. Landes-Vieilles-et-Neuves (76381)
172. Lestanville (76383)
173. Lintot-les-Bois (76389)
174. Londinières (76392)
175. Longmesnil (76393)
176. Longroy (76394)
177. Longueil (76395)
178. Longueville-sur-Scie (76397)
179. Lucy (76399)
180. Luneray (76400)
181. Malleville-les-Grès (76403)
182. Manéhouville (76405)
183. Manneville-ès-Plains (76407)
184. Marques (76411)
185. Martigny (76413)
186. Martin-Église (76414)
187. Massy (76415)
188. Mathonville (76416)
189. Maucomble (76417)
190. Mauquenchy (76420)
191. Melleville (76422)
192. Ménerval (76423)
193. Ménonval (76424)
194. Mésangueville (76426)
195. Mesnières-en-Bray (76427)
196. Le Mesnil-Durdent (76428)
197. Mesnil-Follemprise (76430)
198. Le Mesnil-Lieubray (76431)
199. Mesnil-Mauger (76432)
200. Le Mesnil-Réaume (76435)
201. Meulers (76437)
202. Millebosc (76438)
203. Molagnies (76440)
204. Monchaux-Soreng (76441)
205. Monchy-sur-Eu (76442)
206. Montérolier (76445)
207. Montreuil-en-Caux (76449)
208. Montroty (76450)
209. Morienne (76606)
210. Mortemer (76454)
211. Morville-le-Héron (76455)
212. Muchedent (76458)
213. Nesle-Hodeng (76459)
214. Nesle-Normandeuse (76460)
215. Neufbosc (76461)
216. Neufchâtel-en-Bray (76462)
217. Neuf-Marché (76463)
218. Neuville-Ferrières (76465)
219. Néville (76467)
220. Nolléval (76469)
221. Normanville (76470)
222. Notre-Dame-d'Aliermont (76472)
223. Notre-Dame-du-Parc (76478)
224. Nullemont (76479)
225. Ocqueville (76480)
226. Offranville (76482)
227. Oherville (76483)
228. Omonville (76485)
229. Osmoy-Saint-Valery (76487)
230. Ouainville (76488)
231. Ourville-en-Caux (76490)
232. Ouville-la-Rivière (76492)
233. Paluel (76493)
234. Petit-Caux (76618)
235. Pierrecourt (76500)
236. Pleine-Sève (76504)
237. Pommereux (76505)
238. Pommeréval (76506)
239. Ponts-et-Marais (76507)
240. Preuseville (76511)
241. Puisenval (76512)
242. Quiberville (76515)
243. Quièvrecourt (76516)
244. Rainfreville (76519)
245. Réalcamp (76520)
246. Rétonval (76523)
247. Ricarville-du-Val (76526)
248. Richemont (76527)
249. Rieux (76528)
250. Rocquemont (76532)
251. Roncherolles-en-Bray (76535)
252. Ronchois (76537)
253. Rosay (76538)
254. Rouvray-Catillon (76544)
255. Rouxmesnil-Bouteilles (76545)
256. Royville (76546)
257. Saâne-Saint-Just (76549)
258. Saint-Aubin-le-Cauf (76562)
259. Saint-Aubin-sur-Mer (76564)
260. Saint-Aubin-sur-Scie (76565)
261. Saint-Crespin (76570)
262. Saint-Denis-d'Aclon (76572)
263. Saint-Denis-sur-Scie (76574)
264. Sainte-Agathe-d'Aliermont (76553)
265. Sainte-Beuve-en-Rivière (76567)
266. Sainte-Colombe (76569)
267. Sainte-Foy (76577)
268. Sainte-Geneviève (76578)
269. Sainte-Marguerite-sur-Mer (76605)
270. Saint-Germain-d'Étables (76582)
271. Saint-Germain-sur-Eaulne (76584)
272. Saint-Hellier (76588)
273. Saint-Honoré (76589)
274. Saint-Jacques-d'Aliermont (76590)
275. Saint-Léger-aux-Bois (76598)
276. Saint-Lucien (76601)
277. Saint-Maclou-de-Folleville (76602)
278. Saint-Mards (76604)
279. Saint-Martin-au-Bosc (76612)
280. Saint-Martin-aux-Buneaux (76613)
281. Saint-Martin-le-Gaillard (76619)
282. Saint-Martin-l'Hortier (76620)
283. Saint-Martin-Osmonville (76621)
284. Saint-Michel-d'Halescourt (76623)
285. Saint-Nicolas-d'Aliermont (76624)
286. Saint-Ouen-du-Breuil (76628)
287. Saint-Ouen-le-Mauger (76629)
288. Saint-Ouen-sous-Bailly (76630)
289. Saint-Pierre-Bénouville (76632)
290. Saint-Pierre-des-Jonquières (76635)
291. Saint-Pierre-en-Val (76638)
292. Saint-Pierre-le-Vieux (76641)
293. Saint-Pierre-le-Viger (76642)
294. Saint-Rémy-Boscrocourt (76644)
295. Saint-Riquier-en-Rivière (76645)
296. Saint-Riquier-ès-Plains (76646)
297. Saint-Saëns (76648)
298. Saint-Saire (76649)
299. Saint-Sylvain (76651)
300. Saint-Vaast-d'Équiqueville (76652)
301. Saint-Vaast-Dieppedalle (76653)
302. Saint-Vaast-du-Val (76654)
303. Saint-Valery-en-Caux (76655)
304. Saint-Victor-l'Abbaye (76656)
305. Sassetot-le-Malgardé (76662)
306. Sasseville (76664)
307. Sauchay (76665)
308. Saumont-la-Poterie (76666)
309. Sauqueville (76667)
310. Sept-Meules (76671)
311. Serqueux (76672)
312. Sigy-en-Bray (76676)
313. Smermesnil (76677)
314. Sommery (76678)
315. Sommesnil (76679)
316. Sotteville-sur-Mer (76683)
317. Thil-Manneville (76690)
318. Le Thil-Riberpré (76691)
319. Thiouville (76692)
320. Tocqueville-en-Caux (76694)
321. Torcy-le-Grand (76697)
322. Torcy-le-Petit (76698)
323. Tôtes (76700)
324. Touffreville-sur-Eu (76703)
325. Tourville-sur-Arques (76707)
326. Le Tréport (76711)
327. Val-de-Saâne (76018)
328. Val-de-Scie (76034)
329. Varengeville-sur-Mer (76720)
330. Varneville-Bretteville (76721)
331. Vassonville (76723)
332. Vatierville (76724)
333. Veauville-lès-Quelles (76730)
334. Vénestanville (76731)
335. Ventes-Saint-Rémy (76733)
336. Veules-les-Roses (76735)
337. Veulettes-sur-Mer (76736)
338. Vieux-Rouen-sur-Bresle (76739)
339. Villers-sous-Foucarmont (76744)
340. Villy-sur-Yères (76745)
341. Vittefleur (76748)
342. Wanchy-Capval (76749)

== History ==
The arrondissement of Dieppe was created in 1800. At the January 2017 reorganisation of the arrondissements of Seine-Maritime, it received 12 communes from the arrondissement of Le Havre and four communes from the arrondissement of Rouen, and it lost four communes to the arrondissement of Rouen.

As a result of the reorganisation of the cantons of France which came into effect in 2015, the borders of the cantons are no longer related to the borders of the arrondissements. The cantons of the arrondissement of Dieppe were, as of January 2015:

1. Argueil
2. Aumale
3. Bacqueville-en-Caux
4. Bellencombre
5. Blangy-sur-Bresle
6. Cany-Barville
7. Dieppe-Est
8. Dieppe-Ouest
9. Envermeu
10. Eu
11. Fontaine-le-Dun
12. Forges-les-Eaux
13. Gournay-en-Bray
14. Londinières
15. Longueville-sur-Scie
16. Neufchâtel-en-Bray
17. Offranville
18. Saint-Saëns
19. Saint-Valery-en-Caux
20. Tôtes
