= Vienne (Normandy) =

Location
- Country: France

Physical characteristics
- Source
  - location: Beauval-en-Caux
  - elevation: 147 m (482 ft)
- Mouth
  - location: Saâne in Gueures
  - coordinates: 49°50′N 0°57′E
- Length: 15 km (9.3 mi)

Basin features
- Progression: Saâne→ English Channel

The Vienne is a small river in Normandy, France, 15 kilometres (9.3 mi) in length, It is a right tributary of the Saâne flowing through the department of Seine-Maritime.

== Geography ==
The Vienne has its source in the Pays de Caux in the territory of the commune of Beauval-en-Caux. Taking a northward journey, it flows through the communes of Saint-Mards, Lamberville, Bacqueville-en-Caux, Hermanville, Lammerville and Thil-Manneville before joining the Saâne at Gueures. Like most other rivers in the region, the Vienne is classified as a first class river, offering anglers the chance to catch trout and salmon.

== Bibliography ==
- Albert Hennetier, Aux sources normandes: Promenade au fil des rivières en Seine-Maritime, Ed. Bertout, Luneray, 2006 ISBN 2867436230

== See also ==
- French water management scheme
