= Beauval-en-Caux =

- Commune
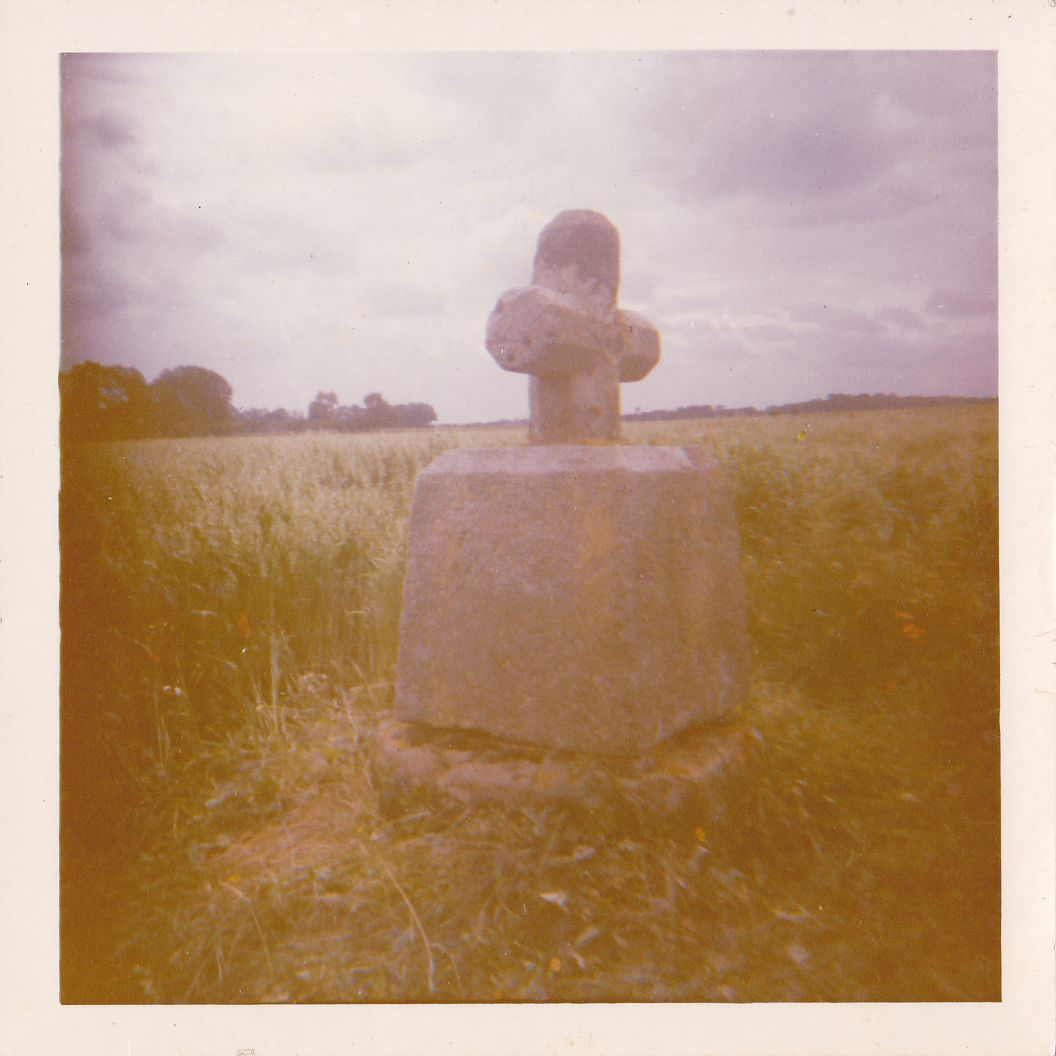
- The cross in 1971

- Coat of arms
- Location of Beauval-en-Caux
- Location within France Location within Normandy
- Coordinates: 49°44′52″N 1°00′55″E
- Country: France
- Region: Normandy
- Department: Seine-Maritime
- Arrondissement: Dieppe
- Canton: Luneray
- Intercommunality: CC Terroir de Caux

Government
  - Mayor (2026–32): Eric Dujardin
- Area^{1}: 15.53 km^{2} (6.00 sq mi)
- Elevation: 150 m (490 ft)
- Highest elevation: 147 m (482 ft)
- Lowest elevation: 84 m (276 ft)
- Population (2023): 464
  - Density: 29.9/km^{2} (77.4/sq mi)
- Time zone: UTC+01:00 (CET)
  - Summer (DST): UTC+02:00 (CEST)
- INSEE/Postal code: 76063 /76890
- ^{1} French Land Register data, which excludes lakes, ponds, glaciers > 1 km^{2} (0.386 sq mi or 247 acres) and river estuaries.

Beauval-en-Caux (French pronunciation: [boval ɑ̃ ko], lit. 'Beauval in Caux') is a commune in the Seine-Maritime department in the Normandy region in northern France.

== Geography ==
A farming village in the Pays de Caux, situated by the banks of the river Vienne, some 13 miles (21 km) southeast of Dieppe, at the junction of the D50, D23 and D927 roads.

== Heraldry ==
Arms of Beauval-en-Caux	The arms of Beauval-en-Caux are blazoned : Argent, on a saltire azure between a trefoil, a lion passant, an eagle head contourny erased and a martlet gules, an oak eradicated.

== Population ==
Historical population
Year	Pop.	±% p.a.
1968	521	—
1975	457	−1.85%
1982	398	−1.96%
1990	412	+0.43%
1999	436	+0.63%
2007	411	−0.74%
2012	481	+3.20%
2017	491	+0.41%
2023	464	−0.94%
Source: INSEE

== Places of interest ==
- The château des Etangs, dating from the sixteenth century.
- The château Blanc, dating from the nineteenth century.
- The church of St.Pierre, dating from the eleventh century.
- The church of St. Geneviève, dating from the eleventh century.
- The chapel, from the sixteenth century.

== See also ==
- Communes of the Seine-Maritime department
