= Bracquetuit =

- Commune
- Location of Bracquetuit
- Location within France Location within Normandy
- Coordinates: 49°40′00″N 1°10′08″E
- Country: France
- Region: Normandy
- Department: Seine-Maritime
- Arrondissement: Dieppe
- Canton: Neufchâtel-en-Bray
- Intercommunality: CC Terroir de Caux

Government
  - Mayor (2026–32): Pascal Vallee
- Area^{1}: 8.47 km^{2} (3.27 sq mi)
- Elevation: 168 m (551 ft)
- Highest elevation: 167 m (548 ft)
- Lowest elevation: 133 m (436 ft)
- Population (2023): 333
  - Density: 39.3/km^{2} (102/sq mi)
- Time zone: UTC+01:00 (CET)
  - Summer (DST): UTC+02:00 (CEST)
- INSEE/Postal code: 76138 /76850
- ^{1} French Land Register data, which excludes lakes, ponds, glaciers > 1 km^{2} (0.386 sq mi or 247 acres) and river estuaries.

Bracquetuit (French pronunciation: [bʁaktɥi]) is a commune in the Seine-Maritime department in the Normandy region in northern France.

== Geography ==
A farming village situated in the Pays de Bray, 21 miles (34 km) south of Dieppe, at the junction of the N29 and the D96 roads.

== Population ==
Historical population
Year	Pop.	±% p.a.
1968	282	—
1975	248	−1.82%
1982	256	+0.45%
1990	298	+1.92%
1999	304	+0.22%
2007	304	+0.00%
2012	335	+1.96%
2017	336	+0.06%
2023	333	−0.15%
Source: INSEE

== Places of interest ==
- The church of St.Marguerite, dating from the twelfth century.
- Two feudal mottes.

== See also ==
- Communes of the Seine-Maritime department
