= Fresnay-le-Long =

- Commune
- Location of Fresnay-le-Long
- Location within France Location within Normandy
- Coordinates: 49°38′57″N 1°05′50″E
- Country: France
- Region: Normandy
- Department: Seine-Maritime
- Arrondissement: Dieppe
- Canton: Luneray
- Intercommunality: CC Terroir de Caux

Government
  - Mayor (2022–2026): Ludovic Noyeau
- Area^{1}: 5.22 km^{2} (2.02 sq mi)
- Elevation: 161 m (528 ft)
- Highest elevation: 176 m (577 ft)
- Lowest elevation: 146 m (479 ft)
- Population (2023): 335
  - Density: 64.2/km^{2} (166/sq mi)
- Time zone: UTC+01:00 (CET)
  - Summer (DST): UTC+02:00 (CEST)
- INSEE/Postal code: 76284 /76850
- ^{1} French Land Register data, which excludes lakes, ponds, glaciers > 1 km^{2} (0.386 sq mi or 247 acres) and river estuaries.

Fresnay-le-Long (French pronunciation: [fʁɛnɛ lə lɔ̃]) is a commune in the Seine-Maritime department in the Normandy region in northern France.

== Geography ==
A small farming village situated in the Pays de Caux, some 22 miles (35 km) south of Dieppe, at the junction of the D99 and the D25 roads.

== Population ==
Historical population
Year	Pop.	±% p.a.
1968	194	—
1975	176	−1.38%
1982	183	+0.56%
1990	204	+1.37%
1999	201	−0.16%
2007	271	+3.81%
2012	316	+3.12%
2017	331	+0.93%
2023	335	+0.20%
Source: INSEE

== Places of interest ==
- The twelfth century church of St.Nicolas.
- The chapel de la Passion-du-Sauveur, dating from the sixteenth century.

== See also ==
- Communes of the Seine-Maritime department
