= Rainfreville =

- Commune
- Location of Rainfreville
- Location within France Location within Normandy
- Coordinates: 49°47′28″N 0°56′17″E
- Country: France
- Region: Normandy
- Department: Seine-Maritime
- Arrondissement: Dieppe
- Canton: Luneray
- Intercommunality: CC Terroir de Caux

Government
  - Mayor (2026–32): Christelle Cahard
- Area^{1}: 2.58 km^{2} (1.00 sq mi)
- Elevation: 60 m (200 ft)
- Highest elevation: 118 m (387 ft)
- Lowest elevation: 42 m (138 ft)
- Population (2023): 74
  - Density: 29/km^{2} (74/sq mi)
- Time zone: UTC+01:00 (CET)
  - Summer (DST): UTC+02:00 (CEST)
- INSEE/Postal code: 76519 /76730
- ^{1} French Land Register data, which excludes lakes, ponds, glaciers > 1 km^{2} (0.386 sq mi or 247 acres) and river estuaries.

Rainfreville (French pronunciation: [ʁɛ̃fʁəvil]) is a commune in the Seine-Maritime department in the Normandy region in northern France.

== Geography ==
A very small farming village situated by the banks of the river Saâne in the Pays de Caux at the junction of the D2 with the D270 road, some 14 miles (23 km) southwest of Dieppe.

== Population ==
Historical population
Year	Pop.	±% p.a.
1968	93	—
1975	99	+0.90%
1982	86	−1.99%
1990	87	+0.14%
1999	83	−0.52%
2007	86	+0.44%
2012	91	+1.14%
2017	69	−5.38%
2023	74	+1.17%
Source: INSEE

== Places of interest ==
- The church of St.Martin & St.Lubin, dating from the seventeenth century.

== People ==
- Eugène Flaman, French locomotive engineer, died here in 1935.

== See also ==
- Communes of the Seine-Maritime department
