= Royville =

- Commune
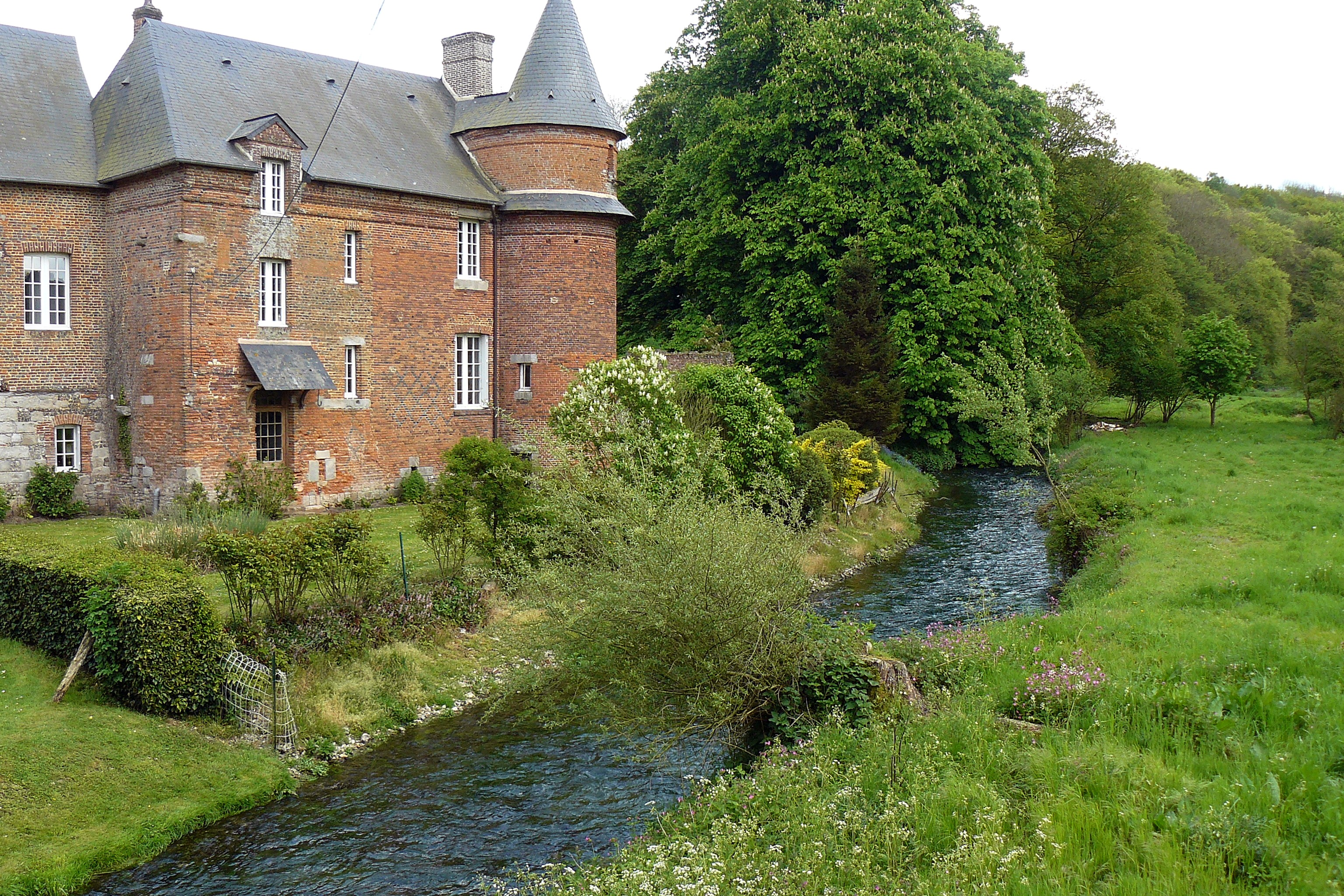
- The Saâne river, at the border with Biville

- Coat of arms
- Location of Royville
- Location within France Location within Normandy
- Coordinates: 49°46′33″N 0°57′22″E
- Country: France
- Region: Normandy
- Department: Seine-Maritime
- Arrondissement: Dieppe
- Canton: Luneray
- Intercommunality: CC Terroir de Caux

Government
  - Mayor (2026–32): Bernard Potez
- Area^{1}: 4.44 km^{2} (1.71 sq mi)
- Elevation: 117 m (384 ft)
- Highest elevation: 127 m (417 ft)
- Lowest elevation: 44 m (144 ft)
- Population (2023): 310
  - Density: 70/km^{2} (180/sq mi)
- Time zone: UTC+01:00 (CET)
  - Summer (DST): UTC+02:00 (CEST)
- INSEE/Postal code: 76546 /76730
- ^{1} French Land Register data, which excludes lakes, ponds, glaciers > 1 km^{2} (0.386 sq mi or 247 acres) and river estuaries.

Royville (French pronunciation: [ʁwavil]) is a commune in the Seine-Maritime department in the Normandy region in northern France.

== Geography ==
A small farming village situated by the banks of the Saâne river in the Pays de Caux at the junction of the D101, D107 and the D149 roads, some 16 miles (26 km) southwest of Dieppe.

== Heraldry ==
Arms of Royville	The arms of Royville are blazoned : Quarterly 1: Azure, a crowned lion argent; 2: Or, a martlet gules; 3: Or, a fleur de lys gules; 4: Azure, a tower argent open and pierced of the field.

== Population ==
Historical population
Year	Pop.	±% p.a.
1968	221	—
1975	207	−0.93%
1982	252	+2.85%
1990	252	+0.00%
1999	216	−1.70%
2007	247	+1.69%
2012	271	+1.87%
2017	282	+0.80%
2023	310	+1.59%
Source: INSEE

== Places of interest ==
- The church of St. Martin, dating from the sixteenth century.

== See also ==
- Communes of the Seine-Maritime department
