= Lestanville =

- Commune
- Location of Lestanville
- Location within France Location within Normandy
- Coordinates: 49°44′51″N 0°57′25″E
- Country: France
- Region: Normandy
- Department: Seine-Maritime
- Arrondissement: Dieppe
- Canton: Luneray
- Intercommunality: CC Terroir de Caux

Government
  - Mayor (2026–32): Ludovic Tremblay
- Area^{1}: 1.63 km^{2} (0.63 sq mi)
- Elevation: 139 m (456 ft)
- Highest elevation: 144 m (472 ft)
- Lowest elevation: 65 m (213 ft)
- Population (2023): 90
  - Density: 55/km^{2} (140/sq mi)
- Time zone: UTC+01:00 (CET)
  - Summer (DST): UTC+02:00 (CEST)
- INSEE/Postal code: 76383 /76730
- ^{1} French Land Register data, which excludes lakes, ponds, glaciers > 1 km^{2} (0.386 sq mi or 247 acres) and river estuaries.

Lestanville is a commune in the Seine-Maritime department in the Normandy region in northern France.

== Geography ==
A very small farming village situated by the banks of the river Saâne in the Pays de Caux, some 15 miles (24 km) southwest of Dieppe at the junction of the D507 and D55 roads.

== Population ==
Historical population
Year	Pop.	±% p.a.
1968	84	—
1975	67	−3.18%
1982	62	−1.10%
1990	68	+1.16%
1999	76	+1.24%
2007	93	+2.56%
2012	95	+0.43%
2017	95	+0.00%
2023	90	−0.90%
Source: INSEE

== See also ==
- Communes of the Seine-Maritime department
