= Avremesnil =

- Commune
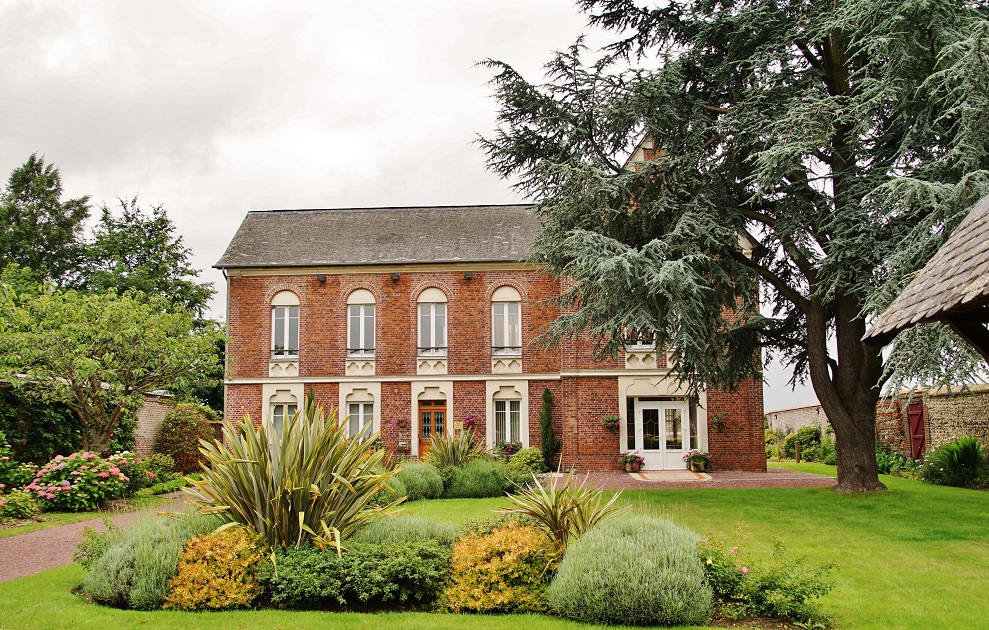
- The town hall in Avremesnil

- Coat of arms
- Location of Avremesnil
- Location within France Location within Normandy
- Coordinates: 49°51′02″N 0°55′40″E
- Country: France
- Region: Normandy
- Department: Seine-Maritime
- Arrondissement: Dieppe
- Canton: Luneray
- Intercommunality: CC Terroir Caux

Government
  - Mayor (2020–2026): Joseph Maussion
- Area^{1}: 5.42 km^{2} (2.09 sq mi)
- Elevation: 90 m (300 ft)
- Highest elevation: 82 m (269 ft)
- Lowest elevation: 11 m (36 ft)
- Population (2023): 994
  - Density: 183/km^{2} (475/sq mi)
- Time zone: UTC+01:00 (CET)
  - Summer (DST): UTC+02:00 (CEST)
- INSEE/Postal code: 76050 /76730
- ^{1} French Land Register data, which excludes lakes, ponds, glaciers > 1 km^{2} (0.386 sq mi or 247 acres) and river estuaries.

Avremesnil (French pronunciation: [avʁəmenil]) is a commune in the Seine-Maritime department in the Normandy region in northern France.

== Geography ==
A farming village in the valley of the Saâne river, in the Pays de Caux, situated some 8 miles (13 km) southwest of Dieppe, at the junction of the D27 and D2 roads.

== Heraldry ==
Arms of Avremesnil	The arms of Avremesnil are blazoned : Argent, a fess between 2 martlets and a lion gules, and a chief paly Or and azure.

== Population ==
Historical population
Year	Pop.	±% p.a.
1968	798	—
1975	839	+0.72%
1982	832	−0.12%
1990	878	+0.67%
1999	873	−0.06%
2007	911	+0.53%
2012	1,025	+2.39%
2017	1,016	−0.18%
2023	994	−0.36%
Source: INSEE

== Places of interest ==
- The church of St. Aubin, dating from the twelfth century.
- The sixteenth century manorhouse.
- The motte and other vestiges of the medieval chateau.

== See also ==
- Communes of the Seine-Maritime department
