= Tocqueville-en-Caux =

- Commune
- Location of Tocqueville-en-Caux
- Location within France Location within Normandy
- Coordinates: 49°46′55″N 0°54′34″E
- Country: France
- Region: Normandy
- Department: Seine-Maritime
- Arrondissement: Dieppe
- Canton: Luneray
- Intercommunality: CC Terroir de Caux

Government
  - Mayor (2020–2026): Edouard Leforestier
- Area^{1}: 3.17 km^{2} (1.22 sq mi)
- Elevation: 121 m (397 ft)
- Highest elevation: 129 m (423 ft)
- Lowest elevation: 45 m (148 ft)
- Population (2023): 138
  - Density: 43.5/km^{2} (113/sq mi)
- Time zone: UTC+01:00 (CET)
  - Summer (DST): UTC+02:00 (CEST)
- INSEE/Postal code: 76694 /76730
- ^{1} French Land Register data, which excludes lakes, ponds, glaciers > 1 km^{2} (0.386 sq mi or 247 acres) and river estuaries.

Tocqueville-en-Caux (French pronunciation: [tɔkvil ɑ̃ ko], literally Tocqueville in Caux) is a commune in the Seine-Maritime department in the Normandy region in northern France.

== Geography ==
A small farming village situated by the banks of the river Saâne in the Pays de Caux, some 12 miles (19 km) southwest of Dieppe, at the junction of the D107, the D307 and the D27 roads.

== Population ==
Historical population
Year	Pop.	±% p.a.
1968	174	—
1975	124	−4.72%
1982	132	+0.90%
1990	119	−1.29%
1999	129	+0.90%
2007	113	−1.64%
2012	134	+3.47%
2017	121	−2.02%
2023	138	+2.22%
Source: INSEE

== Places of interest ==
- The church of St. Pierre, dating from the eleventh century.

== See also ==
- Communes of the Seine-Maritime department
