= Gonnetot =

- Commune
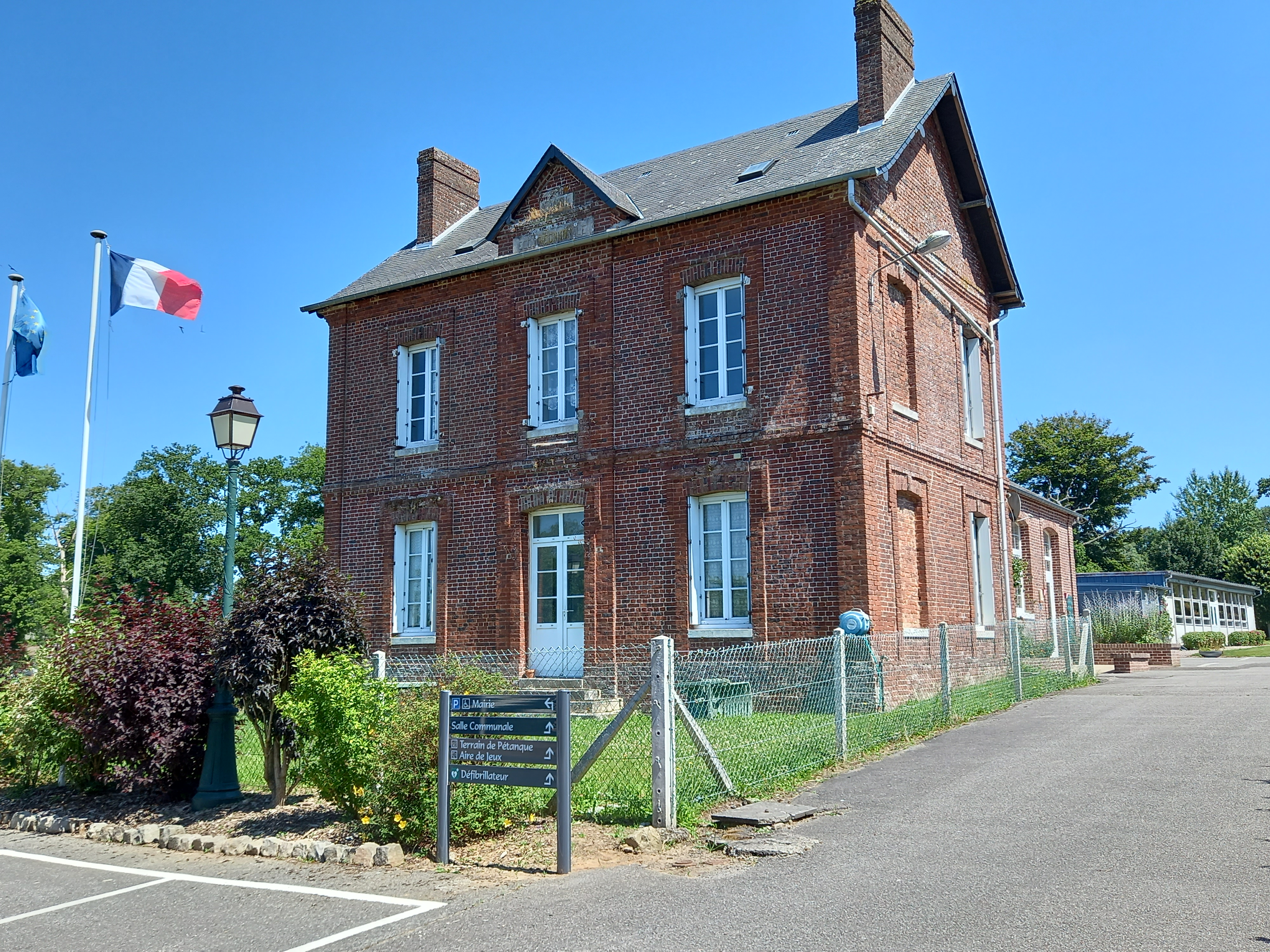
- Town hall
- Location of Gonnetot
- Location within France Location within Normandy
- Coordinates: 49°45′53″N 0°53′56″E
- Country: France
- Region: Normandy
- Department: Seine-Maritime
- Arrondissement: Dieppe
- Canton: Luneray
- Intercommunality: CC Terroir de Caux

Government
  - Mayor (2026–32): Charline François
- Area^{1}: 2.33 km^{2} (0.90 sq mi)
- Elevation: 130 m (430 ft)
- Highest elevation: 138 m (453 ft)
- Lowest elevation: 95 m (312 ft)
- Population (2023): 173
  - Density: 74.2/km^{2} (192/sq mi)
- Time zone: UTC+01:00 (CET)
  - Summer (DST): UTC+02:00 (CEST)
- INSEE/Postal code: 76306 /76730
- ^{1} French Land Register data, which excludes lakes, ponds, glaciers > 1 km^{2} (0.386 sq mi or 247 acres) and river estuaries.

Gonnetot (French pronunciation: [ɡɔnto]) is a commune in the Seine-Maritime department in the Normandy region in northern France. Residents are referred to as Gonnetotais in French.

== Geography ==
Gonnetot is a small farming village situated in the Pays de Caux, some 13 miles (21 km) southwest of Dieppe, on the D27 road and in the valley of the river Saâne.

== Population ==
Historical population
Year	Pop.	±% p.a.
1968	151	—
1975	128	−2.33%
1982	147	+2.00%
1990	130	−1.52%
1999	143	+1.06%
2007	143	+0.00%
2012	169	+3.40%
2017	197	+3.11%
2023	173	−2.14%
Source: INSEE

== Places of interest ==
- The fourteenth century church of Saint-Firmin, rebuilt in 1861.

== See also ==
- Communes of the Seine-Maritime department
