= Lamberville, Seine-Maritime =

Lamberville
- Commune
- Location of Lamberville
- Location within France Location within Normandy
- Coordinates: 49°46′23″N 1°00′07″E
- Country: France
- Region: Normandy
- Department: Seine-Maritime
- Arrondissement: Dieppe
- Canton: Luneray
- Intercommunality: CC Terroir de Caux

Government
  - Mayor (2026–32): Frédéric Jobit
- Area^{1}: 7.33 km^{2} (2.83 sq mi)
- Elevation: 71 m (233 ft)
- Highest elevation: 127 m (417 ft)
- Lowest elevation: 67 m (220 ft)
- Population (2023): 185
  - Density: 25.2/km^{2} (65.4/sq mi)
- Time zone: UTC+01:00 (CET)
  - Summer (DST): UTC+02:00 (CEST)
- INSEE/Postal code: 76379 /76730
- ^{1} French Land Register data, which excludes lakes, ponds, glaciers > 1 km^{2} (0.386 sq mi or 247 acres) and river estuaries.

Lamberville (French pronunciation: [lɑ̃bɛʁvil]) is a commune in the Seine-Maritime department in the Normandy region in northern France.

== Geography ==
Lamberville is a small farming village situated by the banks of the Vienne river in the Pays de Caux, some 10 miles (16 km) southwest of Dieppe at the junction of the D23 and the D55 roads.

== Population ==
Historical population
Year	Pop.	±% p.a.
1968	193	—
1975	184	−0.68%
1982	164	−1.63%
1990	154	−0.78%
1999	172	+1.24%
2007	162	−0.75%
2012	177	+1.79%
2017	192	+1.64%
2023	185	−0.62%
Source: INSEE

== Places of interest ==
- The church of Notre-Dame, dating from the twelfth century.
- The château de Varenville and its park (shared with Bacqueville-en-Caux).
- Two old Normandy farmhouses.

== See also ==
- Communes of the Seine-Maritime department
