= Quiberville-sur-Mer =

Quiberville
- Commune
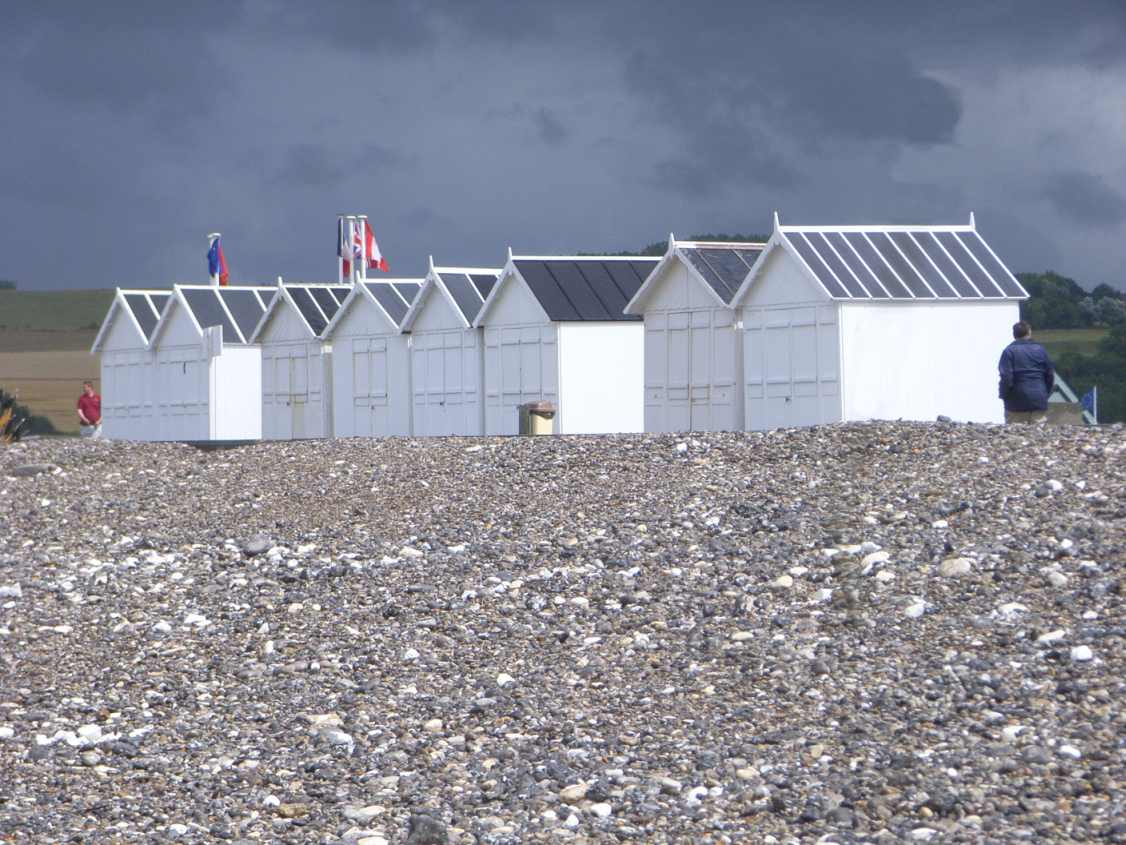
- The beach at Quibervilles

- Coat of arms
- Location of Quiberville
- Location within France Location within Normandy
- Coordinates: 49°53′57″N 0°55′13″E
- Country: France
- Region: Normandy
- Department: Seine-Maritime
- Arrondissement: Dieppe
- Canton: Dieppe-1
- Intercommunality: CC Terroir de Caux

Government
  - Mayor (2026–32): Jean-François Bloc
- Area^{1}: 3.35 km^{2} (1.29 sq mi)
- Elevation: 50 m (160 ft)
- Highest elevation: 58 m (190 ft)
- Lowest elevation: 0 m (0 ft)
- Population (2023): 542
  - Density: 162/km^{2} (419/sq mi)
- Time zone: UTC+01:00 (CET)
  - Summer (DST): UTC+02:00 (CEST)
- INSEE/Postal code: 76515 /76860
- ^{1} French Land Register data, which excludes lakes, ponds, glaciers > 1 km^{2} (0.386 sq mi or 247 acres) and river estuaries.

Quiberville-sur-Mer (French pronunciation: [kibɛʁvil syʁ mɛʁ], lit. 'Quiberville on Sea'; before 2024: Quiberville) is a commune in the Seine-Maritime department in the Normandy region in northern France.

== Geography ==
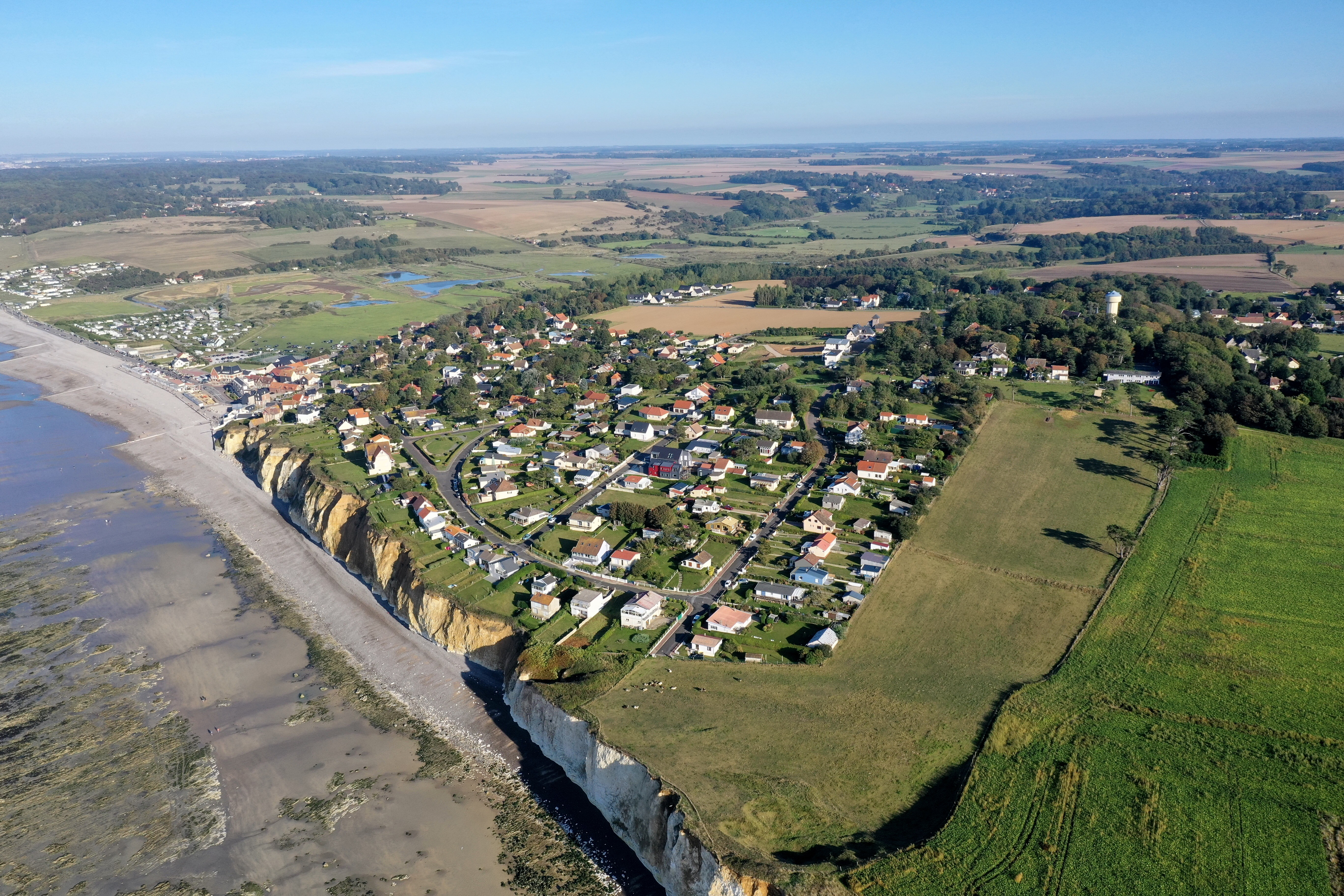
Aerial view from the west, 2019

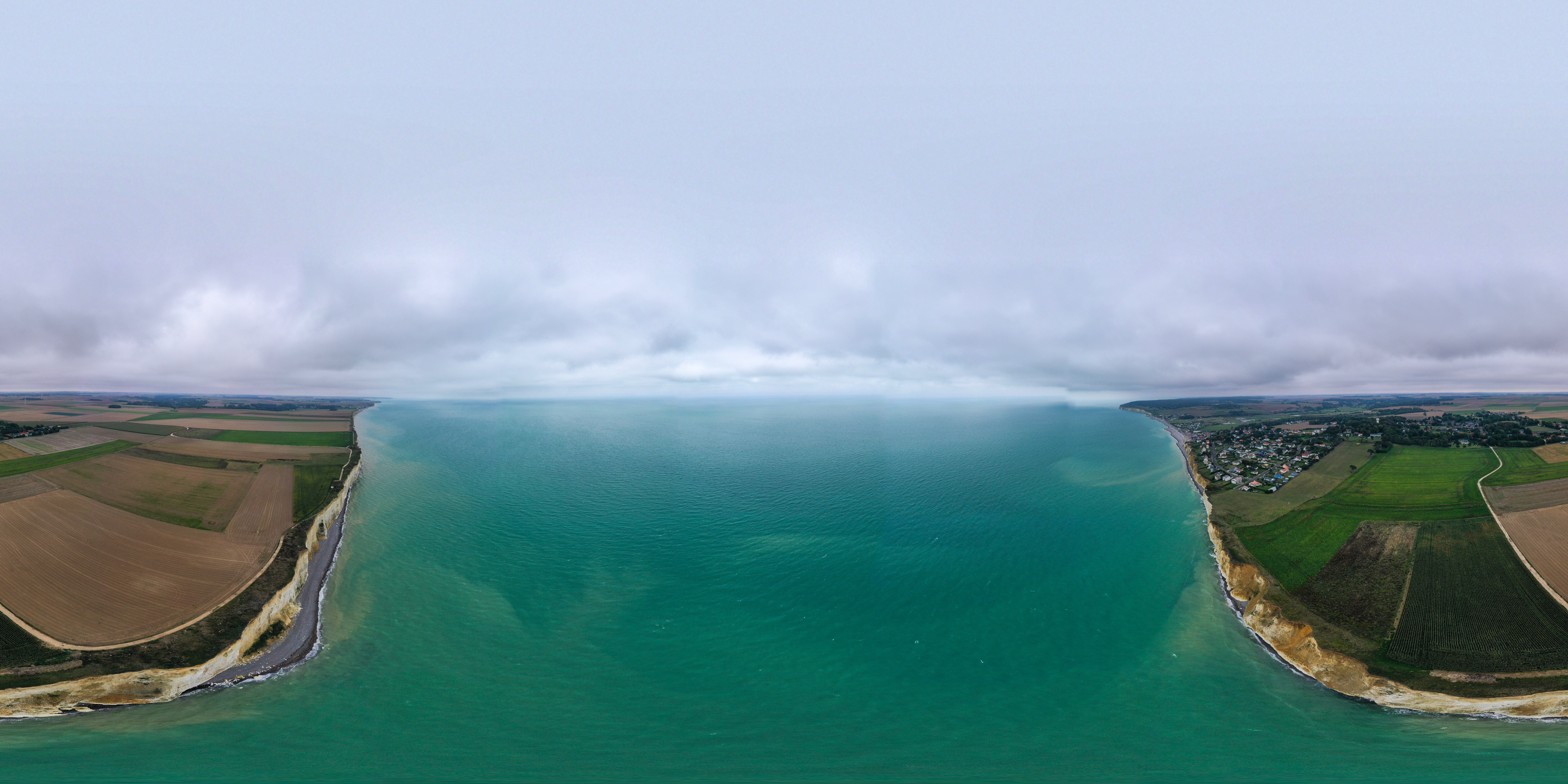
The coastline in 360° (view as a 360° interactive panorama)

This is a village based on tourism and farming, situated by the mouth of the river Saâne in the Pays de Caux. The D2, the D75, and the D127 roads, intersect here some 8 miles (13 km) west of Dieppe. Huge chalk cliffs face a pebble beach and the English Channel.

== Heraldry ==
Arms of Quiberville	The arms of Quiberville are blazoned : Azure, 3 (weavers) shuttles Or, and in chief on an inescutcheon gules, 2 leopards Or, armed and langued azure.

== Population ==
Historical population
Year	Pop.	±% p.a.
1968	362	—
1975	399	+1.40%
1982	427	+0.97%
1990	429	+0.06%
1999	467	+0.95%
2007	508	+1.06%
2012	552	+1.68%
2017	552	+0.00%
2023	542	−0.30%
Source: INSEE

== Places of interest ==
- The church of St. Valery, dating from the twelfth century.
- A stone cross dated 1602.

== See also ==
- Communes of the Seine-Maritime department
