= Gruchet-Saint-Siméon =

- Commune
- Coat of arms
- Location of Gruchet-Saint-Siméon
- Location within France Location within Normandy
- Coordinates: 49°49′07″N 0°53′42″E
- Country: France
- Region: Normandy
- Department: Seine-Maritime
- Arrondissement: Dieppe
- Canton: Luneray
- Intercommunality: CC Terroir de Caux

Government
  - Mayor (2026–32): Jean Sopalski
- Area^{1}: 2.63 km^{2} (1.02 sq mi)
- Elevation: 85 m (279 ft)
- Highest elevation: 94 m (308 ft)
- Lowest elevation: 69 m (226 ft)
- Population (2023): 682
  - Density: 259/km^{2} (672/sq mi)
- Time zone: UTC+01:00 (CET)
  - Summer (DST): UTC+02:00 (CEST)
- INSEE/Postal code: 76330 /76810
- ^{1} French Land Register data, which excludes lakes, ponds, glaciers > 1 km^{2} (0.386 sq mi or 247 acres) and river estuaries.

Gruchet-Saint-Siméon (French pronunciation: [ɡʁyʃɛ sɛ̃ simeɔ̃]) is a commune in the Seine-Maritime department in the Normandy region in northern France.

== Heraldry ==
Arms of Gruchet-Saint-Siméon	The arms of Gruchet-Saint-Siméon are blazoned : Quarterly azure and argent, in bend 2 crosses couped Or, and in bend sinister a crowned lion and a double-headed eagle gules.

== Geography ==
A farming village situated in the Pays de Caux, some 12 miles (19 km) southwest of Dieppe at the junction of the D70 and the D270 roads.

== Population ==
Historical population
Year	Pop.	±% p.a.
1968	612	—
1975	597	−0.35%
1982	601	+0.10%
1990	633	+0.65%
1999	661	+0.48%
2007	700	+0.72%
2012	722	+0.62%
2017	687	−0.99%
2023	682	−0.12%
Source: INSEE

== Places of interest ==
- The church of St.Siméon, dating from the fifteenth century.
- A fifteenth century farmhouse.
- A protestant church.

== See also ==
- Communes of the Seine-Maritime department
