= Brachy =

- Commune
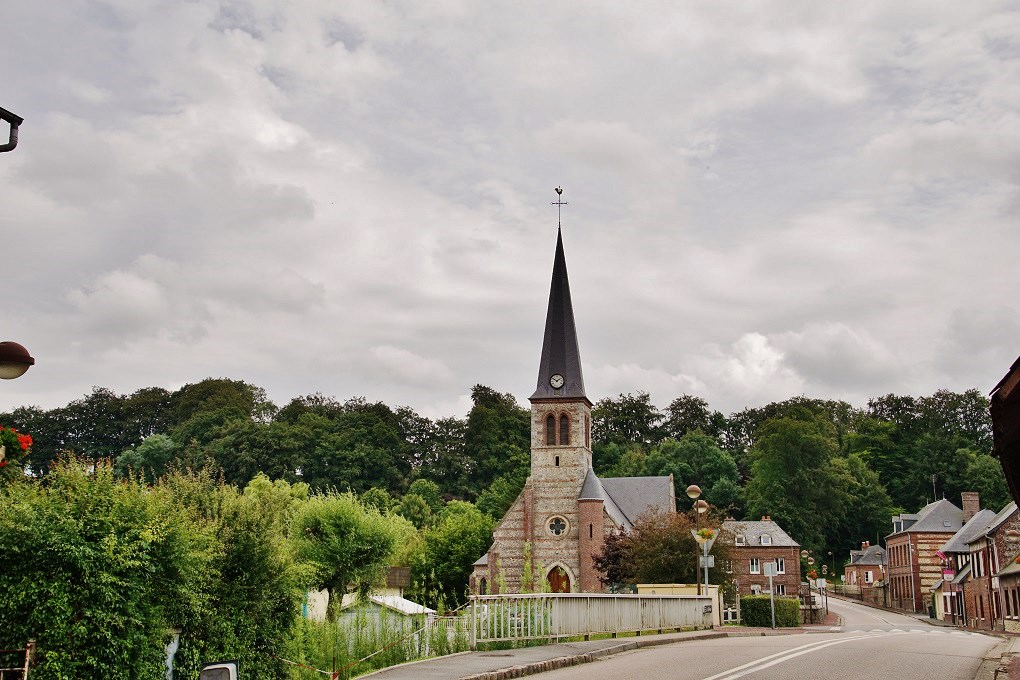
- The church in Brachy

- Coat of arms
- Location of Brachy
- Location within France Location within Normandy
- Coordinates: 49°48′57″N 0°57′02″E
- Country: France
- Region: Normandy
- Department: Seine-Maritime
- Arrondissement: Dieppe
- Canton: Luneray
- Intercommunality: CC Terroir de Caux

Government
  - Mayor (2026–32): Christophe Leroy
- Area^{1}: 11.15 km^{2} (4.31 sq mi)
- Elevation: 35 m (115 ft)
- Highest elevation: 103 m (338 ft)
- Lowest elevation: 24 m (79 ft)
- Population (2023): 663
  - Density: 59.5/km^{2} (154/sq mi)
- Time zone: UTC+01:00 (CET)
  - Summer (DST): UTC+02:00 (CEST)
- INSEE/Postal code: 76136 /76730
- ^{1} French Land Register data, which excludes lakes, ponds, glaciers > 1 km^{2} (0.386 sq mi or 247 acres) and river estuaries.

Brachy (French pronunciation: [bʁaʃi]) is a commune in the Seine-Maritime department in the Normandy region in northern France.

== Geography ==
A farming village situated by the banks of the river Saâne in the Pays de Caux, some 10 miles (16 km) southwest of Dieppe, at the junction of the D4, D108 and the D152 roads.

== Population ==
Historical population
Year	Pop.	±% p.a.
1968	515	—
1975	567	+1.38%
1982	669	+2.39%
1990	661	−0.15%
1999	683	+0.36%
2007	728	+0.80%
2012	757	+0.78%
2017	768	+0.29%
2023	663	−2.42%
Source: INSEE

== Places of interest ==
- Two ancient manorhouses.
- The church of St. Martin, dating from the twelfth century.
- The seventeenth century church of St. Ouen.
- The church of St. Remy, at Gourel, dating from the eleventh century.
- A stone cross from the fifteenth century.

== See also ==
- Communes of the Seine-Maritime department
