= Lammerville =

- Commune
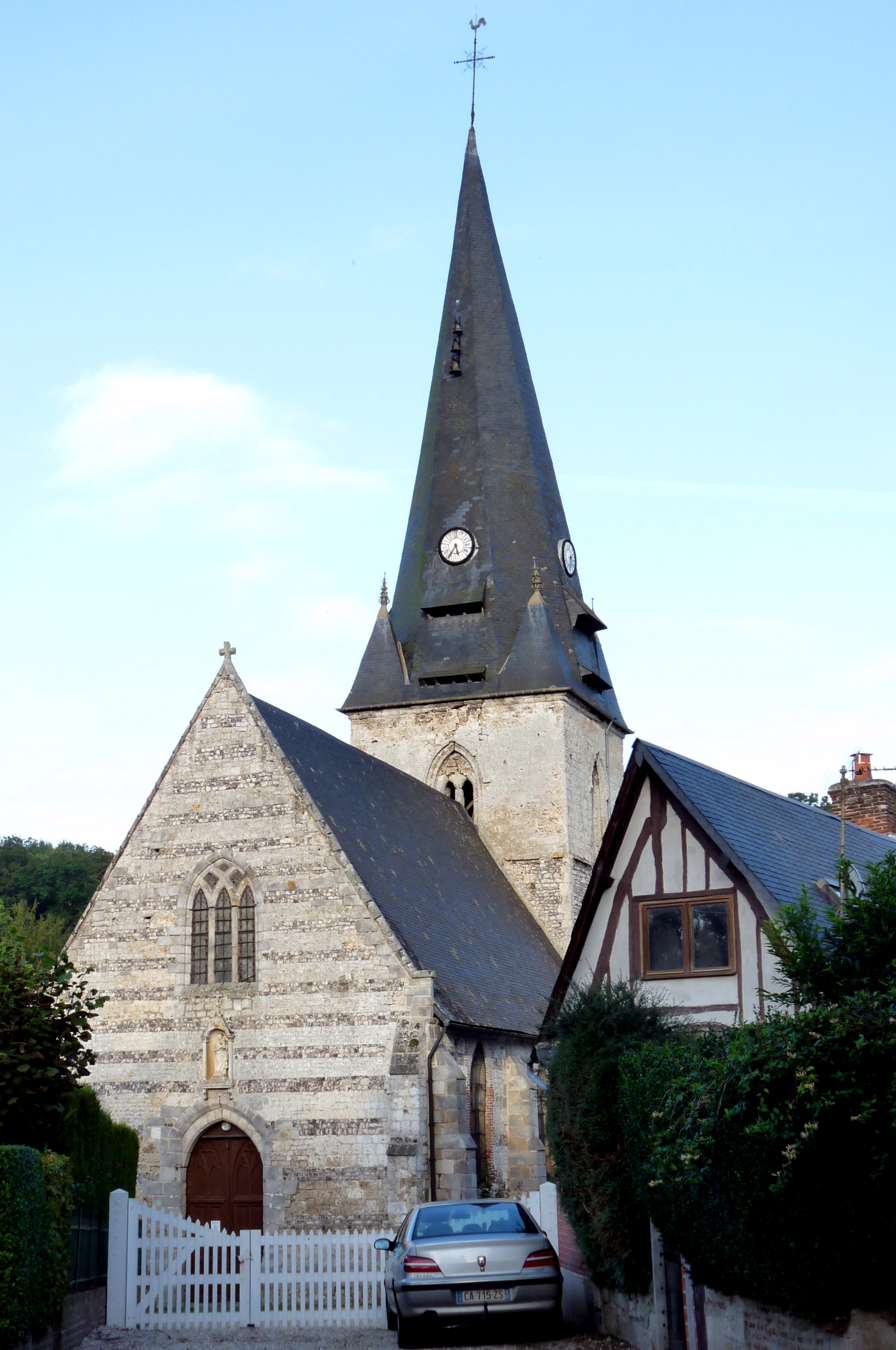
- The church in Lammerville

- Coat of arms
- Location of Lammerville
- Location within France Location within Normandy
- Coordinates: 49°47′50″N 0°58′58″E
- Country: France
- Region: Normandy
- Department: Seine-Maritime
- Arrondissement: Dieppe
- Canton: Luneray
- Intercommunality: CC Terroir de Caux

Government
  - Mayor (2026–32): Blandine Das
- Area^{1}: 8.76 km^{2} (3.38 sq mi)
- Elevation: 80 m (260 ft)
- Highest elevation: 120 m (390 ft)
- Lowest elevation: 40 m (130 ft)
- Population (2023): 302
  - Density: 34.5/km^{2} (89.3/sq mi)
- Time zone: UTC+01:00 (CET)
  - Summer (DST): UTC+02:00 (CEST)
- INSEE/Postal code: 76380 /76730
- ^{1} French Land Register data, which excludes lakes, ponds, glaciers > 1 km^{2} (0.386 sq mi or 247 acres) and river estuaries.

Lammerville (French pronunciation: [lamɛʁvil]) is a commune in the Seine-Maritime department in the Normandy region in northern France.

== Geography ==
A farming village situated by the banks of the Vienne river in the Pays de Caux, some 10 miles (16 km) southwest of Dieppe at the junction of the D152, the D127 and the D270 roads.

== Coat of arms ==
Arms of Lammerville	The arms of Lammerville are blazoned : Quarterly 1: Barry argent and gules, a lion sable; 2: Azure, 3 shoes sable; 3: Argent, 3 hammers gules; and 4: Gules, 3 eagle heads argent.

== Population ==
Historical population
Year	Pop.	±% p.a.
1968	329	—
1975	309	−0.89%
1982	289	−0.95%
1990	310	+0.88%
1999	327	+0.59%
2007	318	−0.35%
2012	321	+0.19%
2017	335	+0.86%
2023	302	−1.71%
Source: INSEE

== Places of interest ==
- The ruins of a feudal castle.
- An eighteenth-century manorhouse.
- The church of Notre-Dame, dating from the twelfth century.
- The remains of a watermill.

== See also ==
- Communes of the Seine-Maritime department
