= Luneray =

- Commune
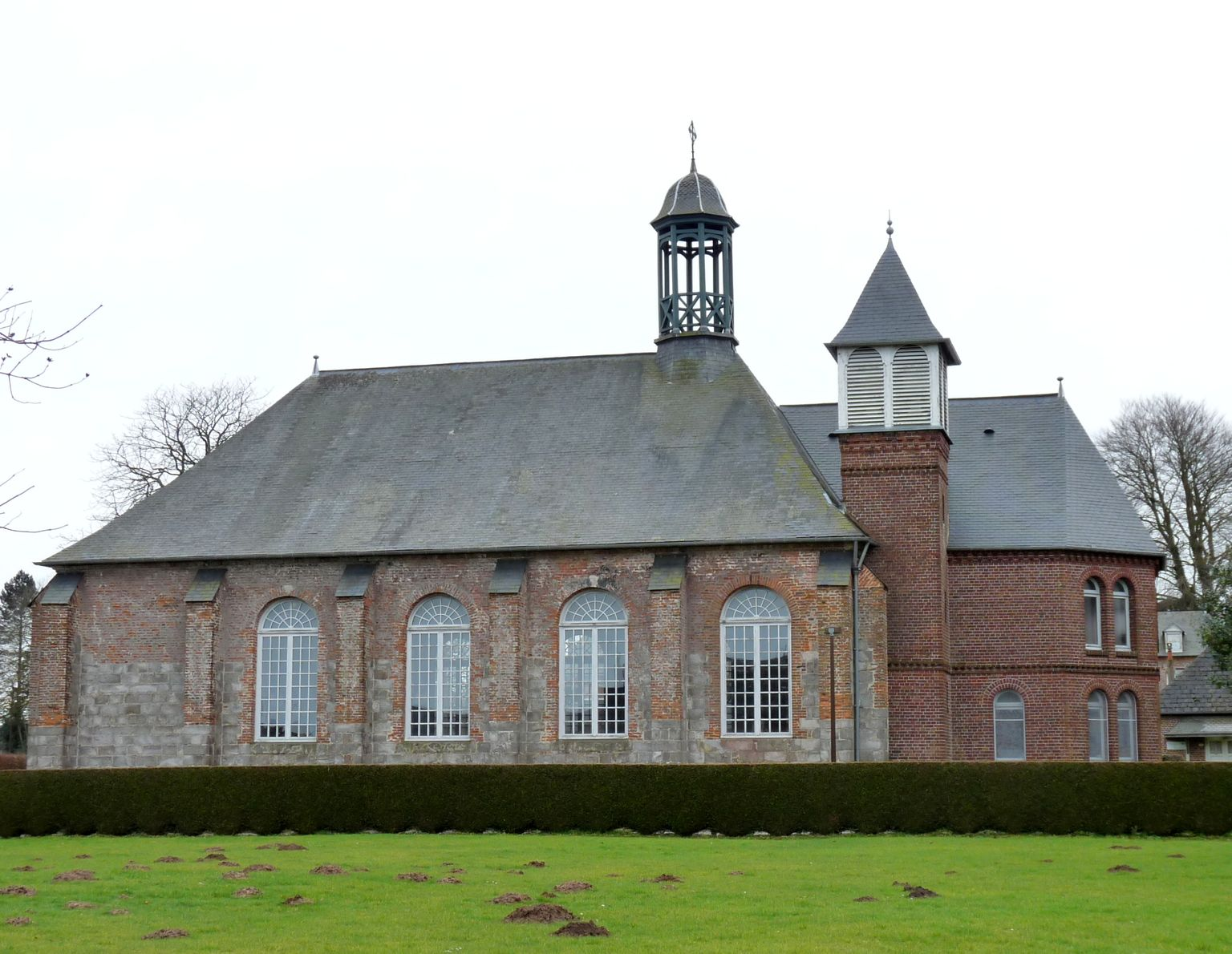
- The Protestant temple in Luneray

- Coat of arms
- Location of Luneray
- Location within France Location within Normandy
- Coordinates: 49°49′45″N 0°54′51″E
- Country: France
- Region: Normandy
- Department: Seine-Maritime
- Arrondissement: Dieppe
- Canton: Luneray
- Intercommunality: CC Terroir de Caux

Government
  - Mayor (2020–2026): Guy Auger
- Area^{1}: 5.08 km^{2} (1.96 sq mi)
- Elevation: 83 m (272 ft)
- Highest elevation: 100 m (330 ft)
- Lowest elevation: 66 m (217 ft)
- Population (2023): 2,169
  - Density: 427/km^{2} (1,110/sq mi)
- Time zone: UTC+01:00 (CET)
  - Summer (DST): UTC+02:00 (CEST)
- INSEE/Postal code: 76400 /76810
- ^{1} French Land Register data, which excludes lakes, ponds, glaciers > 1 km^{2} (0.386 sq mi or 247 acres) and river estuaries.

Luneray (French pronunciation: [lunʁɛ]) is a commune in the Seine-Maritime department in the Normandy region in northern France.

== Geography ==
A small town of farming and light industry situated in the Pays de Caux, some 11 miles (18 km) southwest of Dieppe at the junction of the D70, the D4 and the D27 roads. The commune is also served by the TER railway.

== Heraldry ==
Arms of Luneray	The arms of Luneray are blazoned : Quarterly 1: Per chevron argent and gules; 2: Gules, a chevron between 3 wolf heads Or; 3: Or, 3 lions sable; 4: Argent, 3 ermine spots sable.

== Population ==
Historical population
Year	Pop.	±% p.a.
1968	1,782	—
1975	1,736	−0.37%
1982	1,807	+0.57%
1990	2,006	+1.31%
1999	2,167	+0.86%
2007	2,091	−0.45%
2012	2,147	+0.53%
2017	2,211	+0.59%
2023	2,169	−0.32%
Source: INSEE

== Places of interest ==
- The church of Notre-Dame, dating from the sixteenth century.
- An eighteenth-century Protestant church. Luneray is one of the few Norman communes to have a significant Protestant population. The first French Sunday school was opened Luneray, August 7, 1814 by Pastor Laurent Cadoret, who built the temple with his parishioners

== See also ==
- Communes of the Seine-Maritime department
