= Saâne-Saint-Just =

- Commune
- Location of Saâne-Saint-Just
- Location within France Location within Normandy
- Coordinates: 49°45′39″N 0°55′36″E
- Country: France
- Region: Normandy
- Department: Seine-Maritime
- Arrondissement: Dieppe
- Canton: Luneray
- Intercommunality: Terroir de Caux

Government
  - Mayor (2020–2026): Denis Fauvel
- Area^{1}: 6.94 km^{2} (2.68 sq mi)
- Elevation: 60 m (200 ft)
- Highest elevation: 143 m (469 ft)
- Lowest elevation: 51 m (167 ft)
- Population (2023): 134
  - Density: 19.3/km^{2} (50.0/sq mi)
- Time zone: UTC+01:00 (CET)
  - Summer (DST): UTC+02:00 (CEST)
- INSEE/Postal code: 76549 /76730
- ^{1} French Land Register data, which excludes lakes, ponds, glaciers > 1 km^{2} (0.386 sq mi or 247 acres) and river estuaries.

Saâne-Saint-Just (French pronunciation: [san sɛ̃ ʒy(st)]) is a commune in the Seine-Maritime department in the Normandy region in northern France.

== Geography ==
A small farming village situated in the valley of the Saâne river in the Pays de Caux, some 16 miles (26 km) southwest of Dieppe at the junction of the D2 and D149 roads.

== Population ==
Historical population
Year	Pop.	±% p.a.
1968	109	—
1975	66	−6.92%
1982	106	+7.00%
1990	131	+2.68%
1999	141	+0.82%
2007	139	−0.18%
2012	156	+2.33%
2017	158	+0.26%
2023	134	−2.71%
Source: INSEE

== Places of interest ==
- The church of St.Just, dating from the thirteenth century.
- A feudal motte.

== See also ==
- Communes of the Seine-Maritime department
