= Gueures =

- Commune
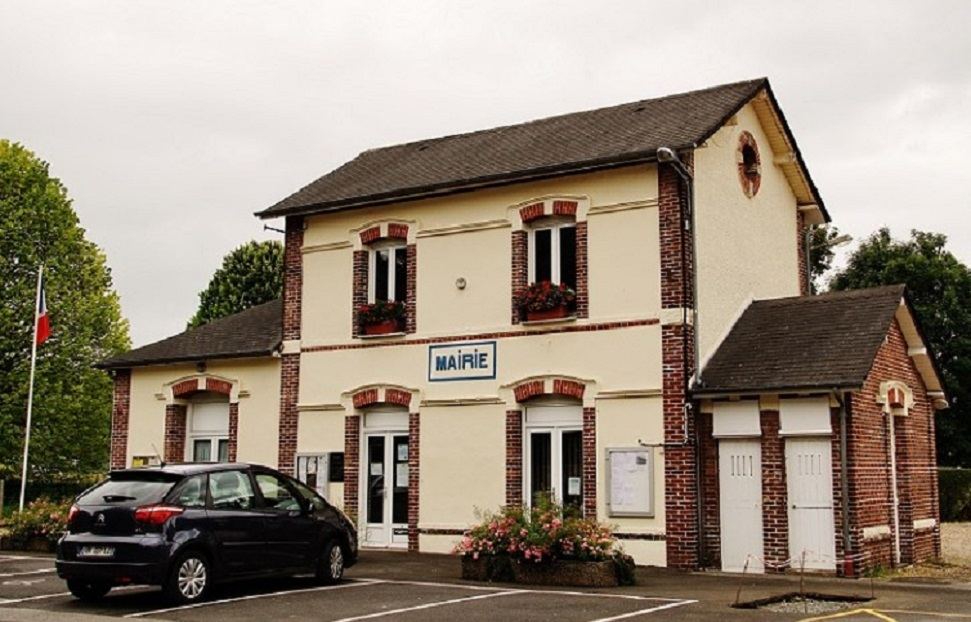
- The town hall in Gueures
- Location of Gueures
- Location within France Location within Normandy
- Coordinates: 49°50′40″N 0°57′47″E
- Country: France
- Region: Normandy
- Department: Seine-Maritime
- Arrondissement: Dieppe
- Canton: Luneray
- Intercommunality: CC Terroir de Caux

Government
  - Mayor (2026–32): Josette Avenel
- Area^{1}: 6.07 km^{2} (2.34 sq mi)
- Elevation: 40 m (130 ft)
- Highest elevation: 84 m (276 ft)
- Lowest elevation: 15 m (49 ft)
- Population (2023): 522
  - Density: 86.0/km^{2} (223/sq mi)
- Time zone: UTC+01:00 (CET)
  - Summer (DST): UTC+02:00 (CEST)
- INSEE/Postal code: 76334 /76730
- ^{1} French Land Register data, which excludes lakes, ponds, glaciers > 1 km^{2} (0.386 sq mi or 247 acres) and river estuaries.

Gueures (French pronunciation: [ɡœʁ]) is a commune in the Seine-Maritime department in the Normandy region in northern France.

== Geography ==
A farming village situated at the confluence of the Saâne and the Vienne rivers, in the Pays de Caux, some 8 miles (13 km) southwest of Dieppe at the junction of the D70, the D123 and the D152 roads.

== Population ==
Historical population
Year	Pop.	±% p.a.
1968	552	—
1975	533	−0.50%
1982	484	−1.37%
1990	462	−0.58%
1999	530	+1.54%
2007	506	−0.58%
2012	538	+1.23%
2017	535	−0.11%
2023	522	−0.41%
Source: INSEE

== Places of interest ==
- The church of St. Pierre, dating from the twelfth century.
- The eighteenth-century château.
- Some interesting houses dating from the seventeenth century.

== See also ==
- Communes of the Seine-Maritime department
