= Auppegard =

- Commune
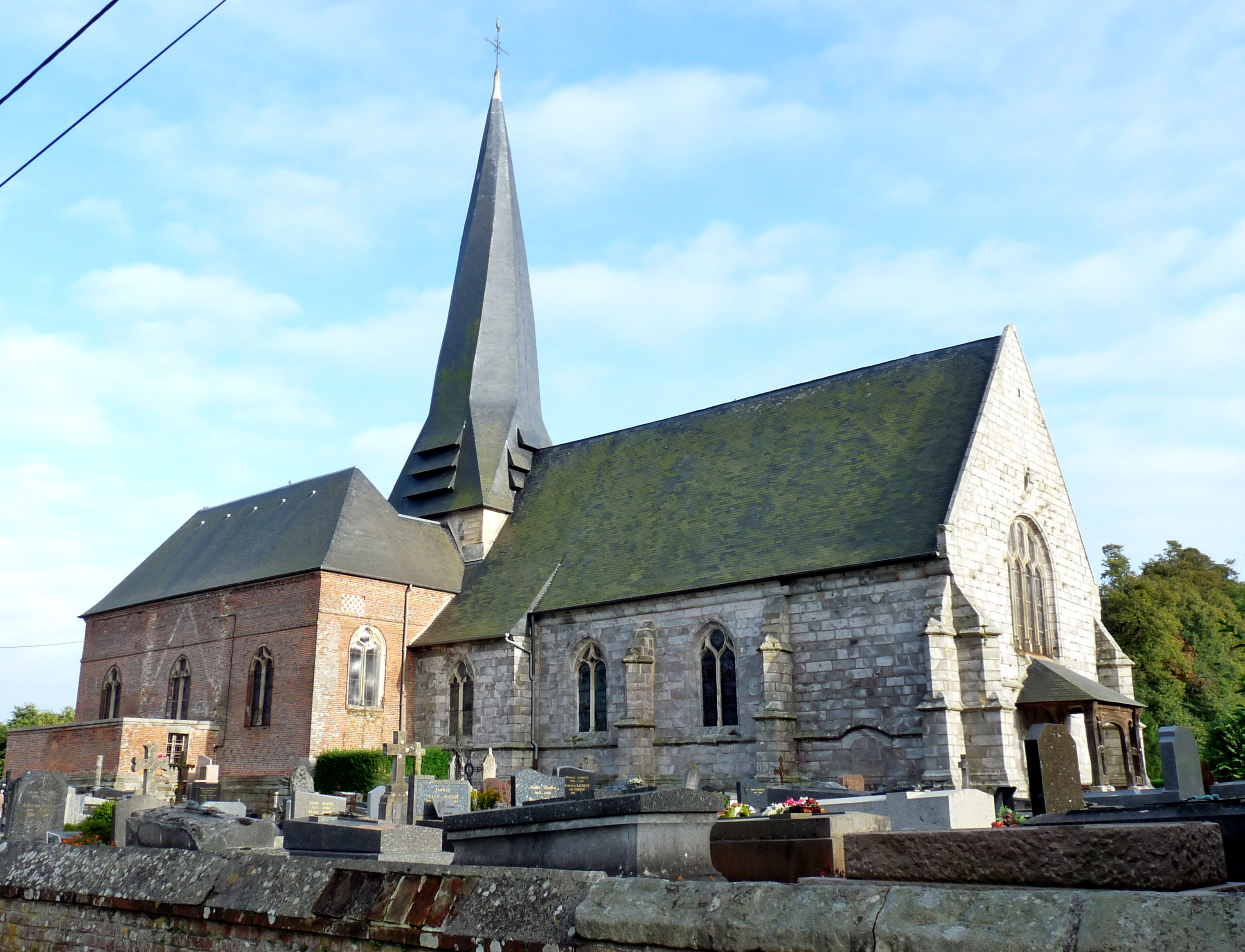
- The church in Auppegard
- Location of Auppegard
- Location within France Location within Normandy
- Coordinates: 49°49′49″N 1°01′50″E
- Country: France
- Region: Normandy
- Department: Seine-Maritime
- Arrondissement: Dieppe
- Canton: Luneray
- Intercommunality: CC Terroir Caux

Government
  - Mayor (2026–32): Dominique Laplace
- Area^{1}: 7.33 km^{2} (2.83 sq mi)
- Elevation: 102 m (335 ft)
- Highest elevation: 107 m (351 ft)
- Lowest elevation: 73 m (240 ft)
- Population (2023): 695
  - Density: 94.8/km^{2} (246/sq mi)
- Time zone: UTC+01:00 (CET)
  - Summer (DST): UTC+02:00 (CEST)
- INSEE/Postal code: 76036 /76730
- ^{1} French Land Register data, which excludes lakes, ponds, glaciers > 1 km^{2} (0.386 sq mi or 247 acres) and river estuaries.

Auppegard (French pronunciation: [opɡaʁ]) is a commune in the Seine-Maritime department in the Normandy region in northern France.

== Geography ==
A farming village situated in the Pays de Caux, some 6 miles (9.7 km) south of Dieppe at the junction of the D108 and D308 roads.

== Etymology ==
Appelgart 1160; Anglo-Norse place name æppel > apple and gardr > yard, garden. Like Applegarth (Yorkshire, Appelgard 1160 ) and Épégard (Eure, Alpegard 1199 ).

It shows, that apples have been grown in Normandy for a long time, probably already to make cider.

== Population ==
Historical population
Year	Pop.	±% p.a.
1968	422	—
1975	468	+1.49%
1982	523	+1.60%
1990	551	+0.65%
1999	561	+0.20%
2007	674	+2.32%
2012	728	+1.55%
2017	716	−0.33%
2023	695	−0.49%
Source: INSEE

== Places of interest ==
- The sixteenth-century church of St.Pierre, with a twisted spire.
- The seventeenth-century château.

== See also ==
- Communes of the Seine-Maritime department
