= Saint-Mards =

- Commune
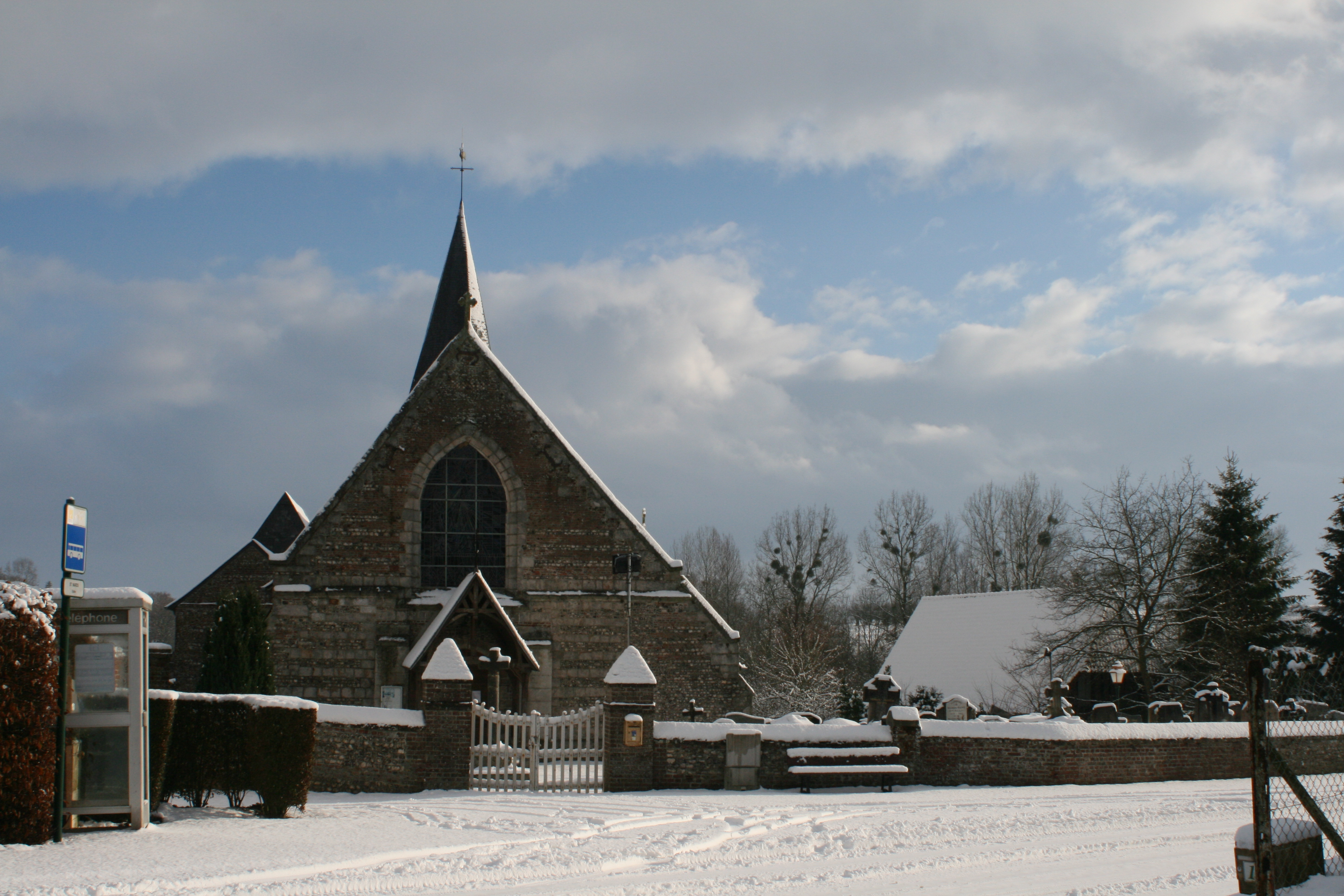
- The church in Saint-Mards
- Location of Saint-Mards
- Location within France Location within Normandy
- Coordinates: 49°45′39″N 1°00′46″E
- Country: France
- Region: Normandy
- Department: Seine-Maritime
- Arrondissement: Dieppe
- Canton: Luneray
- Intercommunality: CC Terroir de Caux

Government
  - Mayor (2026–32): Emmanuel Dubosc
- Area^{1}: 6.52 km^{2} (2.52 sq mi)
- Elevation: 83 m (272 ft)
- Highest elevation: 133 m (436 ft)
- Lowest elevation: 72 m (236 ft)
- Population (2023): 179
  - Density: 27.5/km^{2} (71.1/sq mi)
- Time zone: UTC+01:00 (CET)
  - Summer (DST): UTC+02:00 (CEST)
- INSEE/Postal code: 76604 /76730
- ^{1} French Land Register data, which excludes lakes, ponds, glaciers > 1 km^{2} (0.386 sq mi or 247 acres) and river estuaries.

Saint-Mards is a commune in the Seine-Maritime department in the Normandy region in northern France.

== Geography ==
A small farming village situated by the banks of the Vienne river in the Pays de Caux, at the junction of the D23 and the D76 roads, some 14 miles (23 km) south of Dieppe.

== Population ==
Historical population
Year	Pop.	±% p.a.
1968	174	—
1975	154	−1.73%
1982	167	+1.16%
1990	201	+2.34%
1999	194	−0.39%
2007	176	−1.21%
2012	190	+1.54%
2017	194	+0.42%
2023	179	−1.33%
Source: INSEE

== Places of interest ==
- The church of St.Médard, dating from the eleventh century.

== See also ==
- Communes of the Seine-Maritime department
