= Greuville =

- Commune
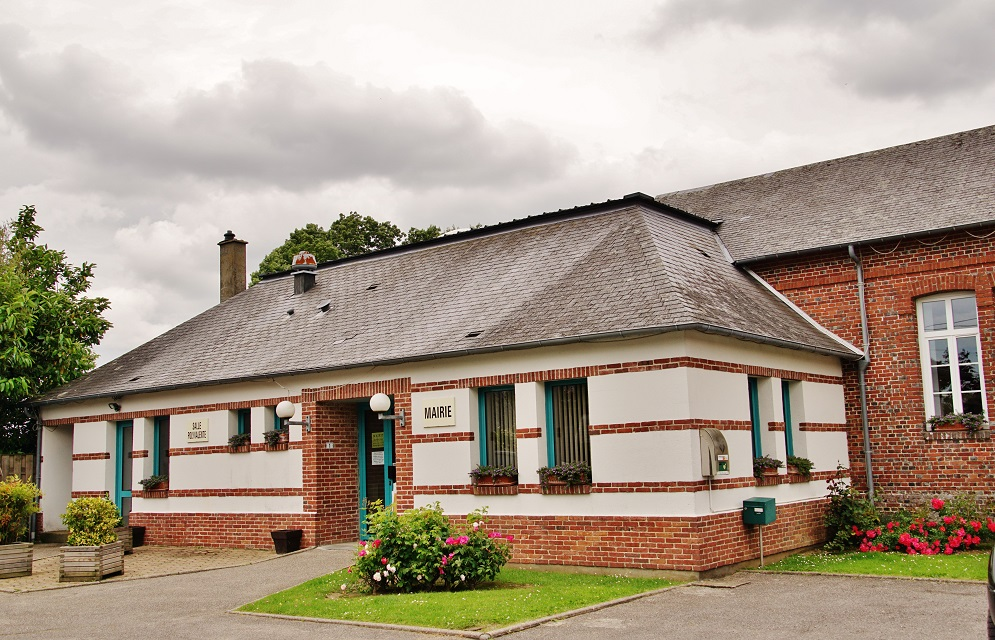
- The town hall in Greuville
- Location of Greuville
- Location within France Location within Normandy
- Coordinates: 49°48′33″N 0°54′45″E
- Country: France
- Region: Normandy
- Department: Seine-Maritime
- Arrondissement: Dieppe
- Canton: Luneray
- Intercommunality: CC Terroir de Caux

Government
  - Mayor (2026–32): Sabrina Colé
- Area^{1}: 2.96 km^{2} (1.14 sq mi)
- Elevation: 90 m (300 ft)
- Highest elevation: 109 m (358 ft)
- Lowest elevation: 88 m (289 ft)
- Population (2023): 368
  - Density: 124/km^{2} (322/sq mi)
- Time zone: UTC+01:00 (CET)
  - Summer (DST): UTC+02:00 (CEST)
- INSEE/Postal code: 76327 /76810
- ^{1} French Land Register data, which excludes lakes, ponds, glaciers > 1 km^{2} (0.386 sq mi or 247 acres) and river estuaries.

Greuville (French pronunciation: [ɡʁøvil]) is a commune in the Seine-Maritime department in the Normandy region in northern France.

== Geography ==
A farming village situated in the Pays de Caux, some 12 miles (19 km) southwest of Dieppe at the junction of the D27, D108 and D270 roads.

== Population ==
Historical population
Year	Pop.	±% p.a.
1968	276	—
1975	287	+0.56%
1982	330	+2.01%
1990	355	+0.92%
1999	315	−1.32%
2007	343	+1.07%
2012	379	+2.02%
2017	379	+0.00%
2023	368	−0.49%
Source: INSEE

== Places of interest ==
- The church of St. Firmin, dating from the sixteenth century.
- A sixteenth-century stone cross.

== See also ==
- Communes of the Seine-Maritime department
