= Thil-Manneville =

- Commune
- Location of Thil-Manneville
- Location within France Location within Normandy
- Coordinates: 49°50′28″N 0°59′38″E
- Country: France
- Region: Normandy
- Department: Seine-Maritime
- Arrondissement: Dieppe
- Canton: Luneray
- Intercommunality: CC Terroir de Caux

Government
  - Mayor (2026–32): Arnaud Adam
- Area^{1}: 6.78 km^{2} (2.62 sq mi)
- Elevation: 73 m (240 ft)
- Highest elevation: 100 m (330 ft)
- Lowest elevation: 22 m (72 ft)
- Population (2023): 659
  - Density: 97.2/km^{2} (252/sq mi)
- Time zone: UTC+01:00 (CET)
  - Summer (DST): UTC+02:00 (CEST)
- INSEE/Postal code: 76690 /76730
- ^{1} French Land Register data, which excludes lakes, ponds, glaciers > 1 km^{2} (0.386 sq mi or 247 acres) and river estuaries.

Thil-Manneville is a commune in the Seine-Maritime department in the Normandy region in north-western France.

== Geography ==
A farming village situated by the banks of the river Vienne in the Pays de Caux, some 7 miles (11 km) southwest of Dieppe, at the junction of the D70 with the D123 and the D127 roads.

== Population ==
Historical population
Year	Pop.	±% p.a.
1968	442	—
1975	414	−0.93%
1982	462	+1.58%
1990	472	+0.27%
1999	450	−0.53%
2007	540	+2.31%
2012	558	+0.66%
2017	608	+1.73%
2023	659	+1.35%
Source: INSEE

== Places of interest ==
- The church of St. Sulpice, dating from the eleventh century.
- A sixteenth-century château.

== See also ==
- Communes of the Seine-Maritime department
