= Omonville =

- Commune
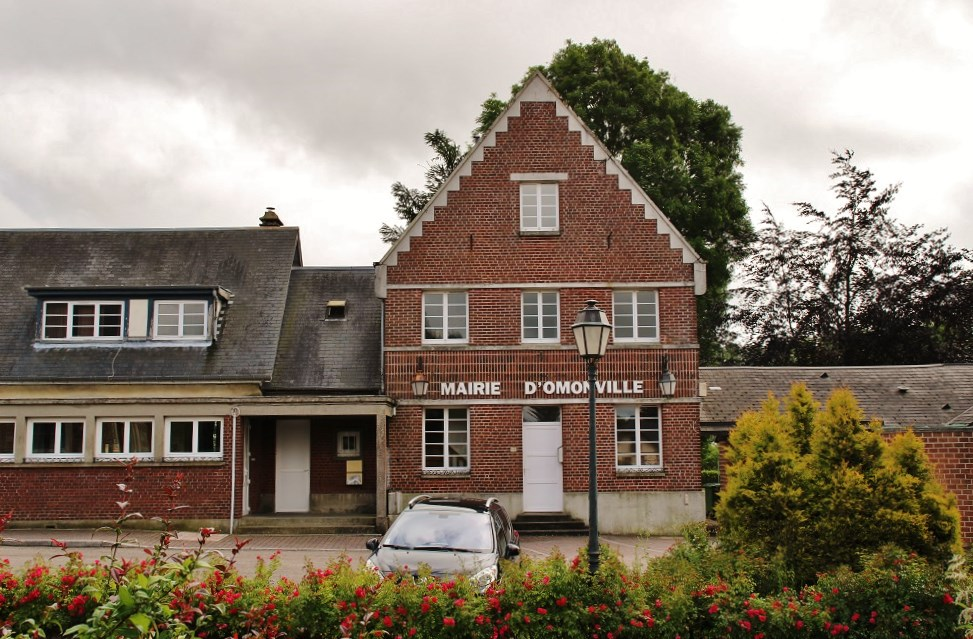
- The town hall in Omonville
- Location of Omonville
- Location within France Location within Normandy
- Coordinates: 49°47′52″N 1°02′53″E
- Country: France
- Region: Normandy
- Department: Seine-Maritime
- Arrondissement: Dieppe
- Canton: Luneray
- Intercommunality: CC Terroir de Caux

Government
  - Mayor (2026–32): René Havard
- Area^{1}: 2.83 km^{2} (1.09 sq mi)
- Elevation: 124 m (407 ft)
- Highest elevation: 131 m (430 ft)
- Lowest elevation: 104 m (341 ft)
- Population (2023): 285
  - Density: 101/km^{2} (261/sq mi)
- Time zone: UTC+01:00 (CET)
  - Summer (DST): UTC+02:00 (CEST)
- INSEE/Postal code: 76485 /76730
- ^{1} French Land Register data, which excludes lakes, ponds, glaciers > 1 km^{2} (0.386 sq mi or 247 acres) and river estuaries.

Omonville (French pronunciation: [ɔmɔ̃vil]) is a commune in the Seine-Maritime department in the Normandy region in northern France.

== Geography ==
A farming village situated in the Pays de Caux at the junction of the D102 and the D927 roads, some 10 miles (16 km) south of Dieppe.

== Population ==
Historical population
Year	Pop.	±% p.a.
1968	285	—
1975	278	−0.35%
1982	291	+0.66%
1990	263	−1.26%
1999	255	−0.34%
2007	273	+0.86%
2012	268	−0.37%
2017	262	−0.45%
2023	285	+1.41%
Source: INSEE

== Places of interest ==
- The church of Notre-Dame, dating from the nineteenth century.
- The château and park.

== See also ==
- Communes of the Seine-Maritime department
