= Auzouville-sur-Saâne =

- Commune
- Location of Auzouville-sur-Saâne
- Location within France Location within Normandy
- Coordinates: 49°44′44″N 0°56′08″E
- Country: France
- Region: Normandy
- Department: Seine-Maritime
- Arrondissement: Dieppe
- Canton: Luneray
- Intercommunality: CC Terroir de Caux

Government
  - Mayor (2026–32): Stéphane Grindel
- Area^{1}: 3.21 km^{2} (1.24 sq mi)
- Elevation: 71 m (233 ft)
- Highest elevation: 146 m (479 ft)
- Lowest elevation: 62 m (203 ft)
- Population (2023): 144
  - Density: 44.9/km^{2} (116/sq mi)
- Time zone: UTC+01:00 (CET)
  - Summer (DST): UTC+02:00 (CEST)
- INSEE/Postal code: 76047 /76730
- ^{1} French Land Register data, which excludes lakes, ponds, glaciers > 1 km^{2} (0.386 sq mi or 247 acres) and river estuaries.

Auzouville-sur-Saâne (French pronunciation: [ozuvil syʁ san], literally Auzouville on Saâne) is a commune in the Seine-Maritime department in the Normandy region in Northern France.

== Geography ==
A small farming village surrounded by woodland, in the Pays de Caux, some 14 miles (23 km) southwest of Dieppe, at the junction of the D55 and D2 roads and on the banks of the river Saâne.

== Population ==
Historical population
Year	Pop.	±% p.a.
1968	162	—
1975	136	−2.47%
1982	164	+2.71%
1990	153	−0.86%
1999	137	−1.22%
2007	151	+1.22%
2012	152	+0.13%
2017	152	+0.00%
2023	144	−0.90%
Source: INSEE

== Places of interest ==
- The nineteenth century church of St. Denis.
- A Manorhouse dating from the fifteenth century.

== See also ==
- Communes of the Seine-Maritime department
