= Biville-la-Rivière =

- Commune
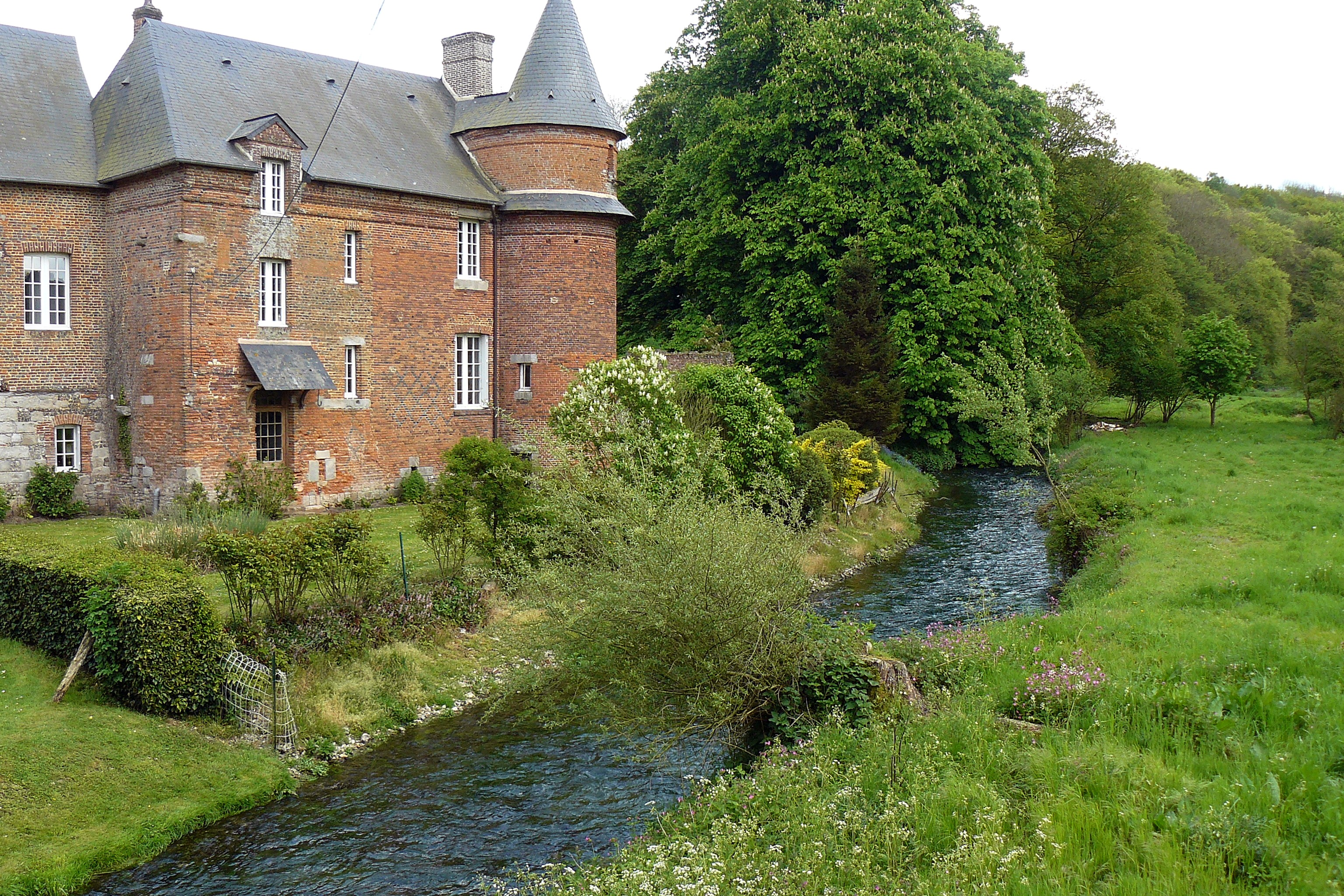
- The River Saâne in Biville-la-Rivière
- Location of Biville-la-Rivière
- Location within France Location within Normandy
- Coordinates: 49°46′36″N 0°55′51″E
- Country: France
- Region: Normandy
- Department: Seine-Maritime
- Arrondissement: Dieppe
- Canton: Luneray
- Intercommunality: CC Terroir de Caux

Government
  - Mayor (2020–2026): Franck Héricher
- Area^{1}: 2.22 km^{2} (0.86 sq mi)
- Elevation: 65 m (213 ft)
- Highest elevation: 128 m (420 ft)
- Lowest elevation: 47 m (154 ft)
- Population (2023): 103
  - Density: 46.4/km^{2} (120/sq mi)
- Time zone: UTC+01:00 (CET)
  - Summer (DST): UTC+02:00 (CEST)
- INSEE/Postal code: 76097 /76730
- ^{1} French Land Register data, which excludes lakes, ponds, glaciers > 1 km^{2} (0.386 sq mi or 247 acres) and river estuaries.

Biville-la-Rivière (French pronunciation: [bivil la ʁivjɛʁ]) is a commune in the Seine-Maritime department in the Normandy region in northern France.

== Geography ==
A small farming village in the Pays de Caux, situated by the banks of the Saâne river, some 14 miles (23 km) southwest of Dieppe, near the junction of the D107 and the D2 roads.

== Population ==
Historical population
Year	Pop.	±% p.a.
1968	124	—
1975	113	−1.32%
1982	102	−1.45%
1990	98	−0.50%
1999	107	+0.98%
2007	106	−0.12%
2012	105	−0.19%
2017	106	+0.19%
2023	103	−0.48%
Source: INSEE

== Places of interest ==
- The church of St.Pierre, dating from the eighteenth century.

== See also ==
- Communes of the Seine-Maritime department
