= Saint-Ouen-le-Mauger =

- Commune
- Location of Saint-Ouen-le-Mauger
- Location within France Location within Normandy
- Coordinates: 49°45′34″N 0°57′45″E
- Country: France
- Region: Normandy
- Department: Seine-Maritime
- Arrondissement: Dieppe
- Canton: Luneray
- Intercommunality: CC Terroir de Caux

Government
  - Mayor (2026–32): Philippe Gosse
- Area^{1}: 6.06 km^{2} (2.34 sq mi)
- Elevation: 135 m (443 ft)
- Highest elevation: 141 m (463 ft)
- Lowest elevation: 90 m (300 ft)
- Population (2023): 282
  - Density: 46.5/km^{2} (121/sq mi)
- Time zone: UTC+01:00 (CET)
  - Summer (DST): UTC+02:00 (CEST)
- INSEE/Postal code: 76629 /76730
- ^{1} French Land Register data, which excludes lakes, ponds, glaciers > 1 km^{2} (0.386 sq mi or 247 acres) and river estuaries.

Saint-Ouen-le-Mauger is a commune in the Seine-Maritime department in the Normandy region in northern France.

== Geography ==
A small farming village situated in the Pays de Caux, on the D101 road, some 12 miles (19 km) southwest of Dieppe.

== Population ==
Historical population
Year	Pop.	±% p.a.
1968	211	—
1975	193	−1.27%
1982	193	+0.00%
1990	177	−1.08%
1999	172	−0.32%
2007	188	+1.12%
2012	252	+6.03%
2017	302	+3.69%
2023	282	−1.14%
Source: INSEE

== Places of interest ==
- The church of St. Ouen, dating from the thirteenth century.

== See also ==
- Communes of the Seine-Maritime department
