= Sassetot-le-Malgardé =

- Commune
- Location of Sassetot-le-Malgardé
- Location within France Location within Normandy
- Coordinates: 49°46′21″N 0°53′25″E
- Country: France
- Region: Normandy
- Department: Seine-Maritime
- Arrondissement: Dieppe
- Canton: Luneray
- Intercommunality: CC Terroir de Caux

Government
  - Mayor (2020–2026): Éric Luce
- Area^{1}: 2.56 km^{2} (0.99 sq mi)
- Elevation: 150 m (490 ft)
- Highest elevation: 130 m (430 ft)
- Lowest elevation: 75 m (246 ft)
- Population (2023): 112
  - Density: 43.7/km^{2} (113/sq mi)
- Time zone: UTC+01:00 (CET)
  - Summer (DST): UTC+02:00 (CEST)
- INSEE/Postal code: 76662 /76730
- ^{1} French Land Register data, which excludes lakes, ponds, glaciers > 1 km^{2} (0.386 sq mi or 247 acres) and river estuaries.

Sassetot-le-Malgardé (French pronunciation: [sasto lə malɡaʁde]) is a commune in the Seine-Maritime department in the Normandy region in northern France.

== Geography ==
A very small farming village situated in the Pays de Caux, some 14 miles (23 km) southwest of Dieppe at the junction of the D107 and the D27 roads.

== Population ==
Historical population
Year	Pop.	±% p.a.
1968	152	—
1975	105	−5.15%
1982	98	−0.98%
1990	100	+0.25%
1999	84	−1.92%
2007	89	+0.73%
2012	104	+3.16%
2017	116	+2.21%
2023	112	−0.58%
Source: INSEE

== Places of interest ==
- The church of St. Vaast, dating from the twelfth century.

== See also ==
- Communes of the Seine-Maritime department
