= Vénestanville =

- Commune
- Location of Vénestanville
- Location within France Location within Normandy
- Coordinates: 49°47′43″N 0°54′17″E
- Country: France
- Region: Normandy
- Department: Seine-Maritime
- Arrondissement: Dieppe
- Canton: Luneray
- Intercommunality: CC Terroir de Caux

Government
  - Mayor (2026–32): François Pasquier
- Area^{1}: 2.64 km^{2} (1.02 sq mi)
- Elevation: 109 m (358 ft)
- Highest elevation: 119 m (390 ft)
- Lowest elevation: 101 m (331 ft)
- Population (2023): 172
  - Density: 65.2/km^{2} (169/sq mi)
- Time zone: UTC+01:00 (CET)
  - Summer (DST): UTC+02:00 (CEST)
- INSEE/Postal code: 76731 /76730
- ^{1} French Land Register data, which excludes lakes, ponds, glaciers > 1 km^{2} (0.386 sq mi or 247 acres) and river estuaries.

Vénestanville (French pronunciation: [venɛtɑ̃vil]) is a commune in the Seine-Maritime department in the Normandy region in northern France.

== Geography ==
Its land is mostly farmed but interspersed with hedges, orchards and small woods. Agriculture in Normandy is biased towards rich pasture. Its human population mostly clusters as a village, mostly either engaged in farming as families or retired. Where the D27 and the D270 roads meet, it is in the Pays de Caux, 14 miles (23 km) southwest of Dieppe.

== Population ==
Historical population
Year	Pop.	±% p.a.
1968	149	—
1975	151	+0.19%
1982	146	−0.48%
1990	153	+0.59%
1999	147	−0.44%
2007	165	+1.45%
2012	178	+1.53%
2017	205	+2.86%
2023	172	−2.88%
Source: INSEE

== Places of interest ==
- The church of Notre-Dame, dating from the eleventh century.
- A stone cross from the sixteenth century.

== See also ==
- Communes of the Seine-Maritime department
