= Bacqueville-en-Caux =

- Commune
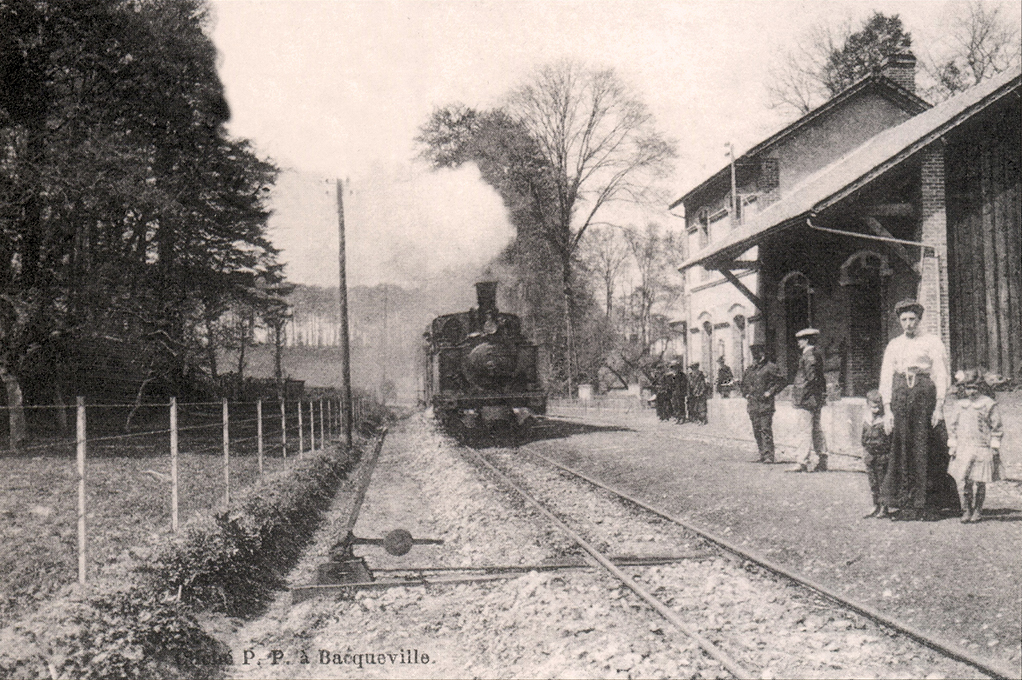
- Bacqueville-en-Caux railway station in 1913

- Coat of arms
- Location of Bacqueville-en-Caux
- Location within France Location within Normandy
- Coordinates: 49°47′15″N 0°59′58″E
- Country: France
- Region: Normandy
- Department: Seine-Maritime
- Arrondissement: Dieppe
- Canton: Luneray
- Intercommunality: CC Terroir de Caux

Government
  - Mayor (2020–2026): Étienne Delarue
- Area^{1}: 12.19 km^{2} (4.71 sq mi)
- Elevation: 92 m (302 ft)
- Highest elevation: 124 m (407 ft)
- Lowest elevation: 45 m (148 ft)
- Population (2023): 1,914
  - Density: 157.0/km^{2} (406.7/sq mi)
- Time zone: UTC+01:00 (CET)
  - Summer (DST): UTC+02:00 (CEST)
- INSEE/Postal code: 76051 /76730
- ^{1} French Land Register data, which excludes lakes, ponds, glaciers > 1 km^{2} (0.386 sq mi or 247 acres) and river estuaries.

Bacqueville-en-Caux (French pronunciation: [bakvil ɑ̃ ko], literally Bacqueville in Caux) is a commune in the Seine-Maritime department in the Normandy region in northern France.

== Geography ==
A farming village in the valley of the river Vienne, in the Pays de Caux, situated some 10 miles (16 km) southwest of Dieppe, at the junction of the D149 and D23 roads.

== Population ==
Historical population
Year	Pop.	±% p.a.
1968	1,665	—
1975	1,605	−0.52%
1982	1,707	+0.88%
1990	1,640	−0.50%
1999	1,640	+0.00%
2007	1,789	+1.09%
2012	1,840	+0.56%
2017	1,901	+0.65%
2023	1,914	+0.11%
Source: INSEE

== History ==
The Baskervilles in England come from this village, called sometimes Baskervilla, Bascervilla in ancient records. (Fictional references include the Hound of the Baskervilles by Sir Arthur Conan Doyle and William of Baskerville in The Name of the Rose by Umberto Eco.) Robert de Bascheville or de Baskeville received lands in Herefordshire after the Battle of Hastings and he held Eardisley Castle in that county.

=== Heraldry ===
Arms of Bacqueville-en-Caux	The arms of Bacqueville-en-Caux are blazoned : Or, 3 hammers gules.

== Places of interest ==
- The church of St. Pierre, dating from the sixteenth century
- The twentieth century war memorial
- Two 13th-century stone crosses
- The church of St. Eutrope, dating from the nineteenth century
- The park and château of Bacqueville dating from the eighteenth century
- Two 16th century manorhouses
- A seventeenth century presbytery

== See also ==
- Communes of the Seine-Maritime department
