= Hermanville, Seine-Maritime =

Hermanville
- Commune
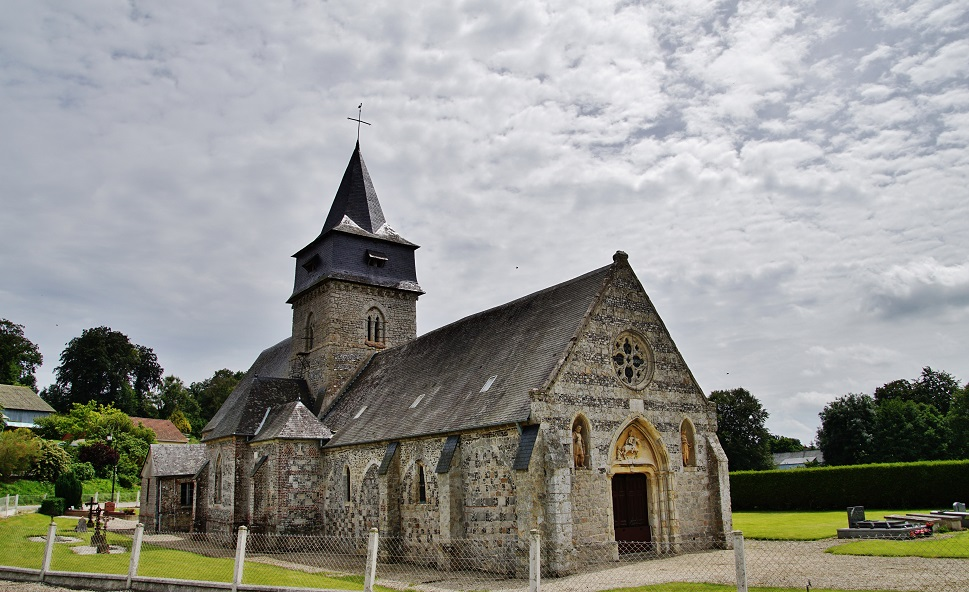
- The church in Hermanville

- Coat of arms
- Location of Hermanville
- Location within France Location within Normandy
- Coordinates: 49°49′14″N 0°59′21″E
- Country: France
- Region: Normandy
- Department: Seine-Maritime
- Arrondissement: Dieppe
- Canton: Luneray
- Intercommunality: CC Terroir de Caux

Government
  - Mayor (2026–32): Myriam Delaunay
- Area^{1}: 4.72 km^{2} (1.82 sq mi)
- Elevation: 48 m (157 ft)
- Highest elevation: 94 m (308 ft)
- Lowest elevation: 32 m (105 ft)
- Population (2023): 111
  - Density: 23.5/km^{2} (60.9/sq mi)
- Time zone: UTC+01:00 (CET)
  - Summer (DST): UTC+02:00 (CEST)
- INSEE/Postal code: 76356 /76730
- ^{1} French Land Register data, which excludes lakes, ponds, glaciers > 1 km^{2} (0.386 sq mi or 247 acres) and river estuaries.

Hermanville (French pronunciation: [ɛʁmɑ̃vil]) is a commune in the Seine-Maritime department in the Normandy region in north-western France.

== Geography ==
A small farming village situated by the banks of the Vienne river in the Pays de Caux, some 9 miles (14 km) southwest of Dieppe, at the junction of the D 108, D 123 and D 127 roads.

== Heraldry ==
Arms of Hermanville	The arms of Hermanville are blazoned : Argent, a fess azure between 3 roses gules, the fess charged with 3 charged bezants [Or] 1: a lion contourny, 2: a double-headed eagle and 3: a lion all sable voided.

== Population ==
Historical population
Year	Pop.	±% p.a.
1968	119	—
1975	101	−2.32%
1982	110	+1.23%
1990	132	+2.31%
1999	111	−1.91%
2007	111	+0.00%
2012	108	−0.55%
2017	116	+1.44%
2023	111	−0.73%
Source: INSEE

== Places of interest ==
- A seventeenth century manorhouse.
- The ruins of a feudal castle.
- The church of St.Martin, dating from the twelfth century.
- An old windmill, now converted to a residence.
- The statue of St. Patrick's Brewery.

== See also ==
- Communes of the Seine-Maritime department
