= Saâne =

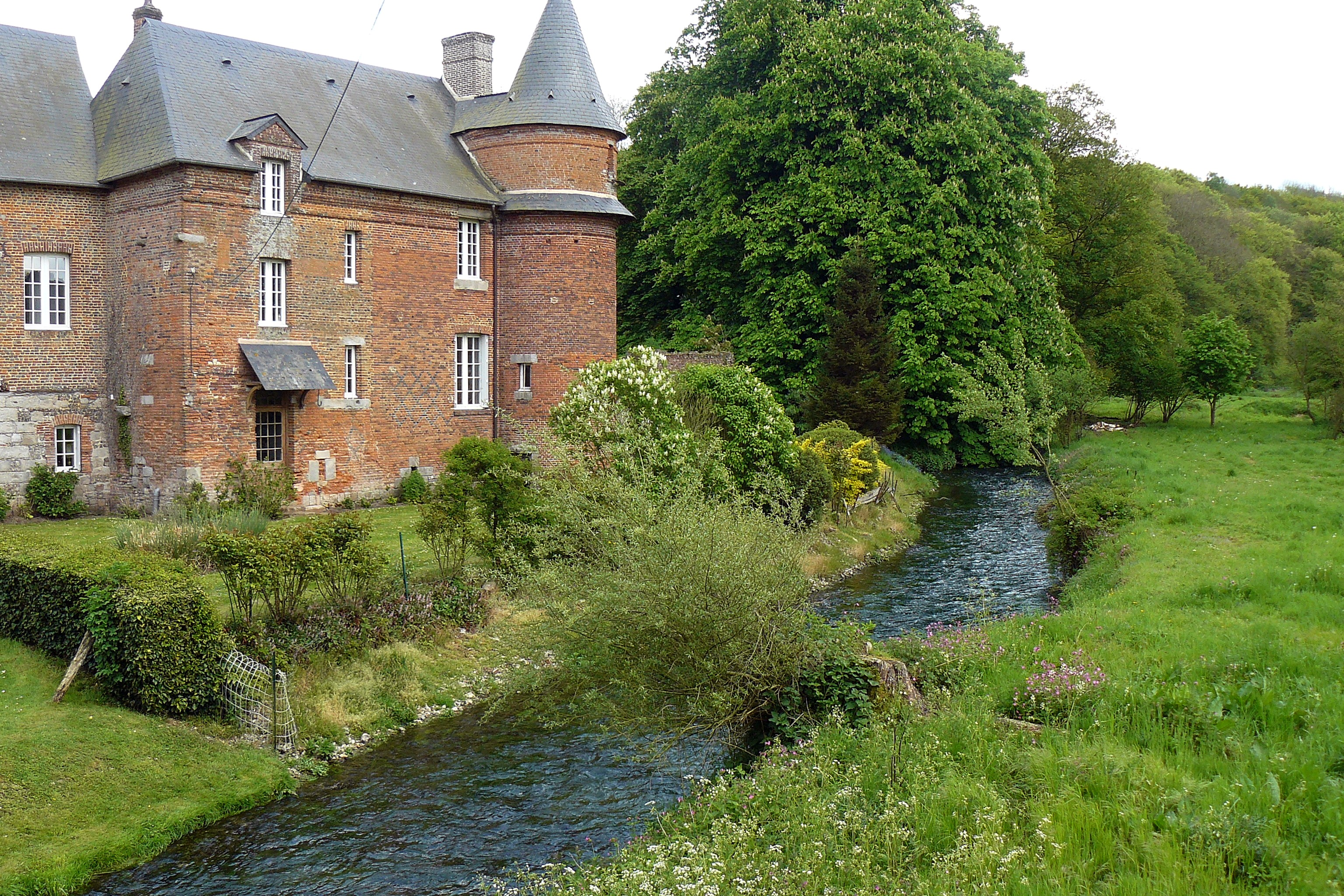
- The Saâne river (Biville-la-Rivière)

- Native name: La Saâne (French)

Location
- Country: France

Physical characteristics
- Source
  - location: Val-de-Saâne
  - elevation: 158 m (518 ft)
- Mouth
  - location: English Channel
  - coordinates: 49°53′N 0°55′E
- Length: 40.1 km (24.9 mi)
- Basin size: 270 km^{2} (100 sq mi)
- Discharge
  - average: 2.6 m^{3}/s (92 cu ft/s)

The Saâne (French pronunciation: [san]) is a river of Normandy, France, 40 kilometres (25 mi) in length, flowing through the department of Seine-Maritime.

== Geography ==
The Saâne has its source in the Pays de Caux in the territory of the hamlet of Varvannes, in the commune of Val-de-Saâne. Taking a northward journey, it flows through the communes of Saâne-Saint-Just, Auzouville-sur-Saâne, Biville-la-Rivière, Brachy, Gueures, Ouville-la-Rivière and Longueil and meets the English Channel between Quiberville and Sainte-Marguerite-sur-Mer. At Longueil, not far from the mouth, the flow is relatively low, at 2.6 m³/s, because of the small size of the watershed (270 km²), however, at Gueures, on the right bank, a significant tributary, the Vienne river, 15 km in length, joins with the Saane. Like most other rivers in the region, the Saâne is classified as a first class river, offering anglers the chance to catch trout and salmon.

== See also ==
- French water management scheme

== Bibliography ==
- Albert Hennetier, Aux sources normandes: Promenade au fil des rivières en Seine-Maritime, Ed. Bertout, Luneray, 2006 ISBN 2867436230
