= Canton of Cany-Barville =

Coordinates: 49°47′54″N 0°37′27″E

Cany-Barville
- Former canton
- Interactive map of Cany-Barville
- Country: France
- Region: Normandy
- Department: Seine-Maritime
- No. of communes: {{{nbcomm}}}
- Disbanded: 2015
- Area: 120.77 km^{2} (46.63 sq mi)
- Population (2012): 9,470
  - Density: 78.4/km^{2} (203/sq mi)

The Canton of Cany-Barville is a former canton situated in the Seine-Maritime département and in the Haute-Normandie region of northern France. It was disbanded following the French canton reorganisation which came into effect in March 2015. It consisted of 18 communes, which joined the canton of Saint-Valery-en-Caux in 2015. It had a total of 9,470 inhabitants (2012).

== Geography ==
An area of farming, forestry and light industry in the arrondissement of Dieppe, centred on the town of Cany-Barville. The altitude varies from 0m (Paluel) to 142 m (Grainville-la-Teinturière) with an average altitude of 58m.

The canton comprised 18 communes:

- Auberville-la-Manuel
- Bertheauville
- Bertreville
- Bosville
- Butot-Vénesville
- Canouville
- Cany-Barville
- Clasville
- Crasville-la-Mallet
- Grainville-la-Teinturière
- Malleville-les-Grès
- Ocqueville
- Ouainville
- Paluel
- Saint-Martin-aux-Buneaux
- Sasseville
- Veulettes-sur-Mer
- Vittefleur

== Population ==
Historical population Canton of Cany-Barville
Year	1962	1968	1975	1982	1990	1999
Pop.	6,677	7,314	7,291	8,874	9,105	9,316
±%	—	+9.5%	−0.3%	+21.7%	+2.6%	+2.3%
From the year 1962 on: No double counting – residents of multiple communes (e.g. students and military personnel) are counted only once. Source: INSEE

== See also ==
- Arrondissements of the Seine-Maritime department
- Cantons of the Seine-Maritime department
- Communes of the Seine-Maritime department
