= Canton of Ourville-en-Caux =

Coordinates: 49°43′12″N 0°41′02″E

Ourville-en-Caux
- Former canton
- Interactive map of Ourville-en-Caux
- Country: France
- Region: Normandy
- Department: Seine-Maritime
- No. of communes: {{{nbcomm}}}
- Disbanded: 2015
- Area: 91.68 km^{2} (35.40 sq mi)
- Population (2012): 5,177
  - Density: 56.47/km^{2} (146.3/sq mi)

The Canton of Ourville-en-Caux is a former canton situated in the Seine-Maritime département and in the Haute-Normandie region of northern France. It was disbanded following the French canton reorganisation which came into effect in March 2015. It had a total of 5,177 inhabitants (2012).

== Geography ==
An area of farming and light industry in the arrondissement of Le Havre, centred on the town of Ourville-en-Caux. The altitude varies from 36m (Le Hanouard) to 152m (Anvéville) with an average altitude of 105m.

The canton comprised 16 communes:

- Ancourteville-sur-Héricourt
- Anvéville
- Beuzeville-la-Guérard
- Carville-Pot-de-Fer
- Cleuville
- Le Hanouard
- Hautot-l'Auvray
- Héricourt-en-Caux
- Oherville
- Ourville-en-Caux
- Robertot
- Routes
- Saint-Vaast-Dieppedalle
- Sommesnil
- Thiouville
- Veauville-lès-Quelles

== Population ==
Historical population Canton of Ourville-en-Caux
Year	1962	1968	1975	1982	1990	1999
Pop.	3,660	3,956	3,708	4,193	4,213	4,568
±%	—	+8.1%	−6.3%	+13.1%	+0.5%	+8.4%
From the year 1962 on: No double counting – residents of multiple communes (e.g. students and military personnel) are counted only once. Source: INSEE

== See also ==
- Arrondissements of the Seine-Maritime department
- Cantons of the Seine-Maritime department
- Communes of the Seine-Maritime department
