= Cigarette Camp =

U.S. Army camps in Europe during World War II

A Cigarette Camp was one of a number of temporary U.S. Army "tent cities" situated principally around the French ports of Le Havre and Marseille following their captures by Allied Forces in the wake of the Allied D-Day invasion in June 1944 and Operation Dragoon in August 1944.

Le Havre camps were located in an area the Army designated the "Red Horse" staging area and named after popular brands, including Camps Lucky Strike, Old Gold, and Pall Mall. Another group of temporary camps established at the same time in France took their names from United States cities and are referred to as "City Camps". A single Cigarette Camp, Tophat, was located in Antwerp, Belgium.

The Cigarette Camps were administered by the 89th Infantry Division, headquartered at Bois-Guillaume, near Rouen.

== Origin of names ==
The names of cigarettes and cities were chosen for two reasons:

First, and primarily, for security. Referring to the camps without an indication of their geographical location went a long way to ensuring that the enemy would not know precisely where they were. Anybody eavesdropping or listening to radio traffic would think that cigarettes were being discussed or the camp was stateside, especially regarding the city camps. Secondly, there was a subtle psychological reason, the premise being that troops heading into battle wouldn't mind staying at a place where cigarettes must be plentiful and troops about to depart for combat would be somehow comforted in places with familiar names of cities back home (Camp Atlanta, Camp Baltimore, Camp New York, and Camp Pittsburgh, among others).

The camps varied widely in size, from around 2,000 in capacity to nearly 60,000 at the largest of the "Big Three", Camps Philip Morris, Old Gold, and Lucky Strike.

== French camps ==
The nine Cigarette Camps included:

- Camp Home Run, Sanvic: 2,000
- Camp Wings, on the grounds of the Blaville Aerodrome: 2,250
- Camp Pall Mall, at Etretat: 7,700
- Camp Herbert Tareyton, located in the :fr:Forest of Montgeon (park): 16,400
- Camp Twenty Grand, at Saint-Pierre-de-Varengeville: 20,000
- Camp Philip Morris, Gainneville: 35,000
- Camp Old Gold, at Ourville-en-Caux/Yerville/Doudeville/Yvetot: 35,000
- Camp Lucky Strike, at Saint-Sylvain, Seine-Maritime between Cany and Saint-Valery-en-Caux: 58,000
- Camp Chesterfield: (unknown)

== Belgian camp ==
- Camp Tophat was a "Cigarette Camp" located near Antwerp, Belgium, named after a popular American brand. Exact capacity is unknown, but the single camp fielded "thousands of black 20-man tents".

== Role shift ==
By war's end, both Cigarette and City camps' roles had shifted from gateways to combat staging GIs for repatriation to the U.S., processing liberated American POWs, and temporarily confining German POWs.

Post-war, many of the camps survived with yet new roles, including housing for displaced persons at least into the mid-1950s.
