= Daniel Pierre =

French athlete

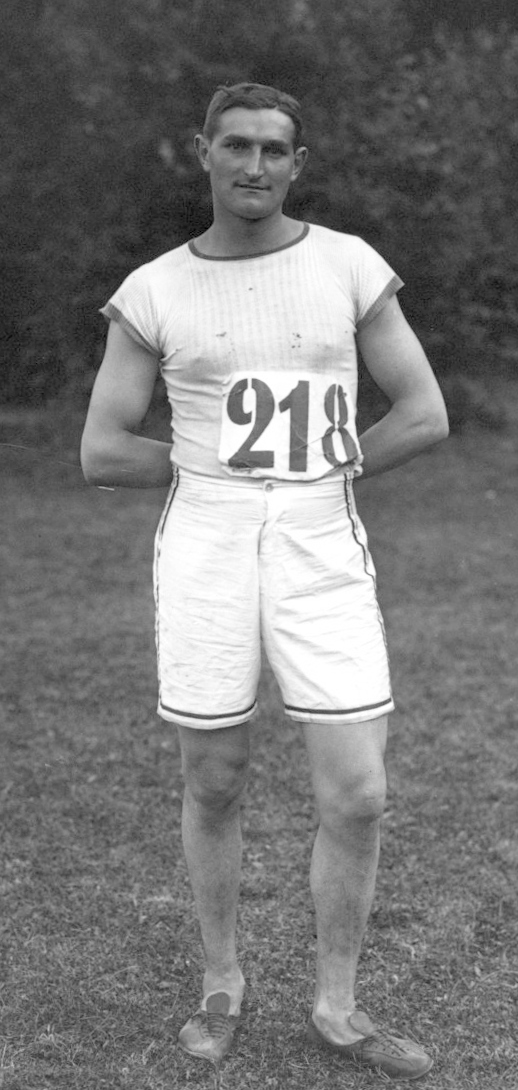
- Daniel Pierre in 1913

Personal information
- Born: 17 January 1891 in Ouainville, France
- Died: 21 January 1979 (aged 88)

Sport
- Sport: Athletics
- Event(s): Shot put, discus throw
- Club: BFC Rouen; Football Club Rouen

Achievements and titles
- Personal best(s): SP – 13.88 m (1930); DT – 43.30 m (1925)

Daniel Pierre (17 January 1891 – 21 January 1979) was a French athlete. He competed in the discus throw and shot put at the 1920 and 1924 Summer Olympics and finished in 15–19th place.
