= Durdent =

Durdent may refer to:

- Durdent (river), a small coastal river that flows from the Pays de Caux in Normandy, France into the English Channel
- Le Mesnil-Durdent, a commune in the Seine-Maritime département, France
- Walter Durdent, a medieval Bishop of Coventry
