= Criquetot-le-Mauconduit =

- Commune
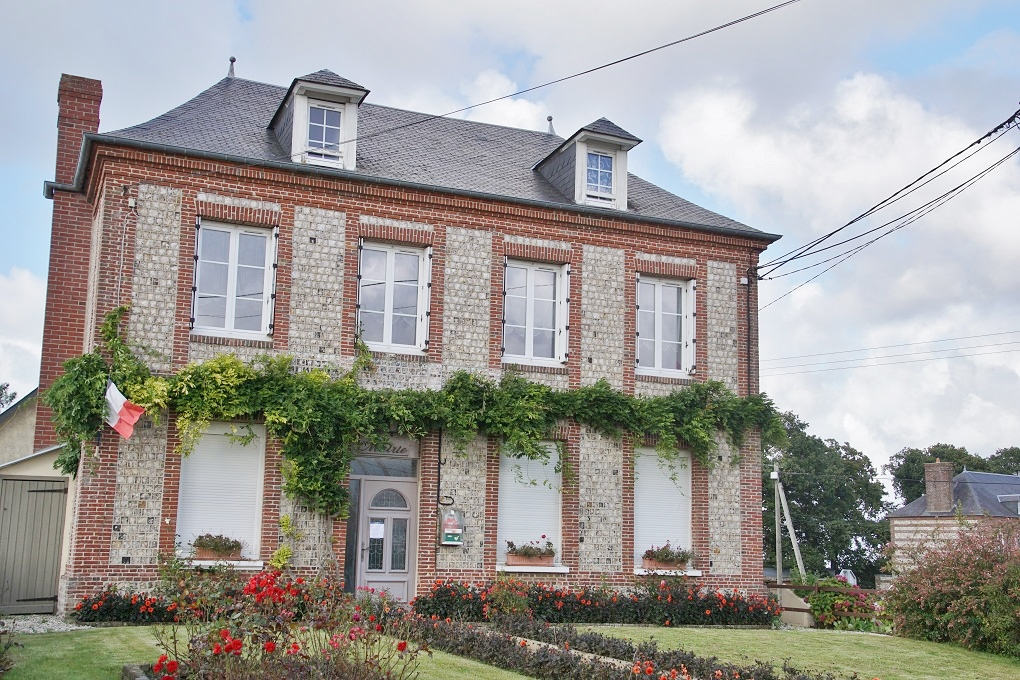
- The town hall in Criquetot-le-Mauconduit
- Location of Criquetot-le-Mauconduit
- Location within France Location within Normandy
- Coordinates: 49°47′38″N 0°33′43″E
- Country: France
- Region: Normandy
- Department: Seine-Maritime
- Arrondissement: Le Havre
- Canton: Fécamp
- Intercommunality: CC Côte d'Albâtre

Government
  - Mayor (2026–32): Marc Rousselin
- Area^{1}: 4.12 km^{2} (1.59 sq mi)
- Elevation: 100 m (330 ft)
- Highest elevation: 113 m (371 ft)
- Lowest elevation: 64 m (210 ft)
- Population (2023): 196
  - Density: 47.6/km^{2} (123/sq mi)
- Time zone: UTC+01:00 (CET)
  - Summer (DST): UTC+02:00 (CEST)
- INSEE/Postal code: 76195 /76540
- ^{1} French Land Register data, which excludes lakes, ponds, glaciers > 1 km^{2} (0.386 sq mi or 247 acres) and river estuaries.

Criquetot-le-Mauconduit (French pronunciation: [kʁikto lə mokɔ̃dɥi]) is a commune in the Seine-Maritime department in the Normandy region in northern France.

The inhabitants of the town of Criquetot-le-Mauconduit are called Criquetotais, Criquetotaises in French.

== Geography ==
A small farming village situated in the Pays de Caux, some 29 miles (47 km) northeast of Le Havre, at the junction of the D479 and D471 roads.

== Population ==
Historical population
Year	Pop.	±% p.a.
1968	163	—
1975	123	−3.94%
1982	118	−0.59%
1990	142	+2.34%
1999	130	−0.98%
2007	137	+0.66%
2012	182	+5.84%
2017	176	−0.67%
2023	196	+1.81%
Source: INSEE

== Places of interest ==
- The church of St. Rémy, dating from the twelfth century.

== See also ==
- Communes of the Seine-Maritime department
