= Sainte-Colombe, Seine-Maritime =

Sainte-Colombe
- Commune
- Coat of arms
- Location of Sainte-Colombe
- Location within France Location within Normandy
- Coordinates: 49°48′03″N 0°45′37″E
- Country: France
- Region: Normandy
- Department: Seine-Maritime
- Arrondissement: Dieppe
- Canton: Saint-Valery-en-Caux
- Intercommunality: CC Côte d'Albâtre

Government
  - Mayor (2026–32): Jean-François Burel
- Area^{1}: 5.74 km^{2} (2.22 sq mi)
- Elevation: 103 m (338 ft)
- Highest elevation: 114 m (374 ft)
- Lowest elevation: 77 m (253 ft)
- Population (2023): 223
  - Density: 38.9/km^{2} (101/sq mi)
- Time zone: UTC+01:00 (CET)
  - Summer (DST): UTC+02:00 (CEST)
- INSEE/Postal code: 76569 /76460
- ^{1} French Land Register data, which excludes lakes, ponds, glaciers > 1 km^{2} (0.386 sq mi or 247 acres) and river estuaries.

Sainte-Colombe (French pronunciation: [sɛ̃t kɔlɔ̃b]) is a commune in the Seine-Maritime department in the Normandy region in northern France.

== Geography ==
A small farming village situated in the Pays de Caux, some 17 miles (27 km) southwest of Dieppe at the junction of the D20 and the D75 roads.

== Population ==
Historical population
Year	Pop.	±% p.a.
1968	248	—
1975	231	−1.01%
1982	231	+0.00%
1990	177	−3.27%
1999	194	+1.02%
2007	202	+0.51%
2012	198	−0.40%
2017	215	+1.66%
2023	223	+0.61%
Source: INSEE

== Places of interest ==
- The church of St. Colombe, dating from the sixteenth century.

== See also ==
- Communes of the Seine-Maritime department
