= Pleine-Sève =

- Commune
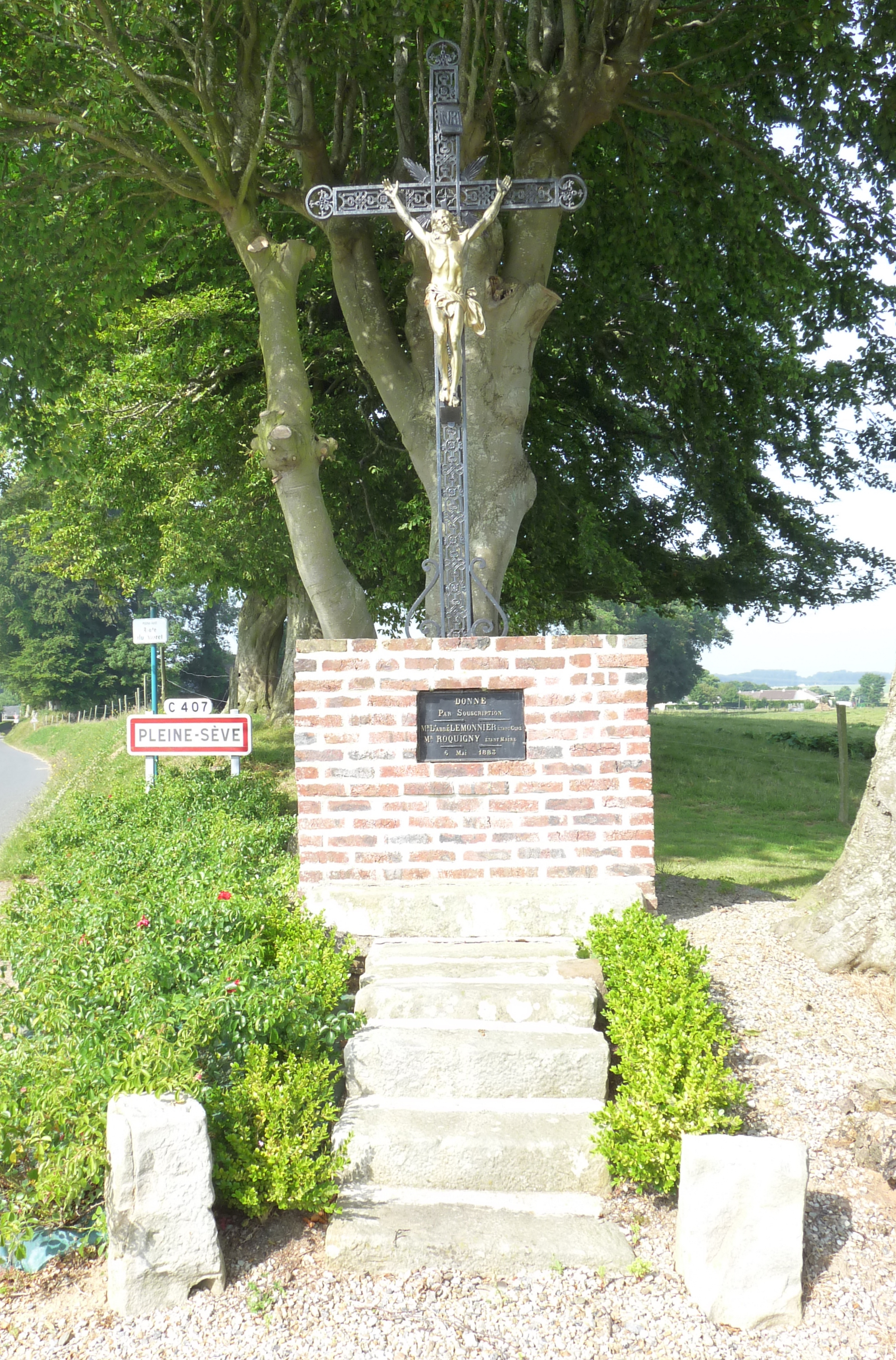
- The cross in Pleine-Sève

- Coat of arms
- Location of Pleine-Sève
- Location within France Location within Normandy
- Coordinates: 49°49′07″N 0°45′32″E
- Country: France
- Region: Normandy
- Department: Seine-Maritime
- Arrondissement: Dieppe
- Canton: Saint-Valery-en-Caux
- Intercommunality: CC Côte d'Albâtre

Government
  - Mayor (2020–2026): Béatrice Lerond
- Area^{1}: 4.07 km^{2} (1.57 sq mi)
- Elevation: 80 m (260 ft)
- Highest elevation: 101 m (331 ft)
- Lowest elevation: 50 m (160 ft)
- Population (2023): 133
  - Density: 32.7/km^{2} (84.6/sq mi)
- Time zone: UTC+01:00 (CET)
  - Summer (DST): UTC+02:00 (CEST)
- INSEE/Postal code: 76504 /76460
- ^{1} French Land Register data, which excludes lakes, ponds, glaciers > 1 km^{2} (0.386 sq mi or 247 acres) and river estuaries.

Pleine-Sève is a commune in the Seine-Maritime department in the Normandy region in northern France.

== Geography ==
A small farming village situated in the Durdent valley in the Pays de Caux near the junction of the D70 and the D20 roads, some 21 miles (34 km) southwest of Dieppe.

== Population ==
Historical population
Year	Pop.	±% p.a.
1968	111	—
1975	93	−2.50%
1982	137	+5.69%
1990	125	−1.14%
1999	108	−1.61%
2007	114	+0.68%
2012	135	+3.44%
2017	133	−0.30%
2023	133	+0.00%
Source: INSEE

== Places of interest ==
- The church of St. Jean-Baptiste, dating from the sixteenth century.

== See also ==
- Communes of the Seine-Maritime department
