= Manneville-ès-Plains =

- Commune
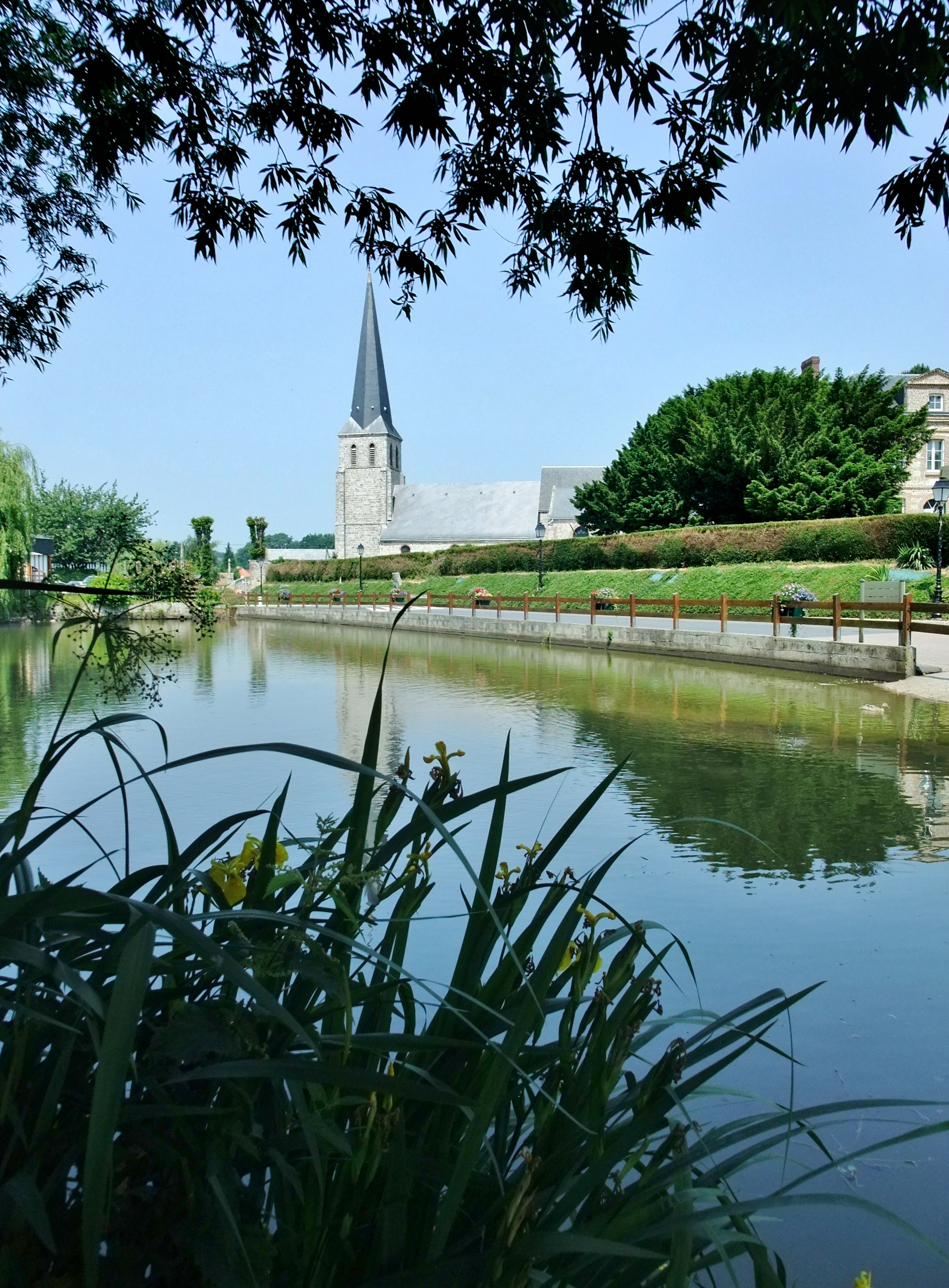
- The church in Manneville-ès-Plains

- Coat of arms
- Location of Manneville-ès-Plains
- Location within France Location within Normandy
- Coordinates: 49°51′21″N 0°45′20″E
- Country: France
- Region: Normandy
- Department: Seine-Maritime
- Arrondissement: Dieppe
- Canton: Saint-Valery-en-Caux
- Intercommunality: CC Côte d'Albâtre

Government
  - Mayor (2026–32): Gérard Fouché
- Area^{1}: 6.36 km^{2} (2.46 sq mi)
- Elevation: 65 m (213 ft)
- Highest elevation: 83 m (272 ft)
- Lowest elevation: 0 m (0 ft)
- Population (2023): 310
  - Density: 49/km^{2} (130/sq mi)
- Time zone: UTC+01:00 (CET)
  - Summer (DST): UTC+02:00 (CEST)
- INSEE/Postal code: 76407 /76460
- ^{1} French Land Register data, which excludes lakes, ponds, glaciers > 1 km^{2} (0.386 sq mi or 247 acres) and river estuaries.

Manneville-ès-Plains is a commune in the Seine-Maritime department in the Normandy region in northern France.

== Geography ==
A small farming village situated in the Pays de Caux, some 20 miles (32 km) southwest of Dieppe at the junction of the D925, the D24 and the D68 roads. The commune's short northern border comprises huge chalk cliffs facing the English Channel.

== Population ==
Historical population
Year	Pop.	±% p.a.
1968	186	—
1975	177	−0.71%
1982	156	−1.79%
1990	226	+4.74%
1999	258	+1.48%
2007	258	+0.00%
2012	268	+0.76%
2017	280	+0.88%
2023	310	+1.71%
Source: INSEE

== Places of interest ==
- The church of Notre-Dame, dating from the sixteenth century.
- A sixteenth century manorhouse.

== See also ==
- Communes of the Seine-Maritime department
