= Gueutteville-les-Grès =

- Commune
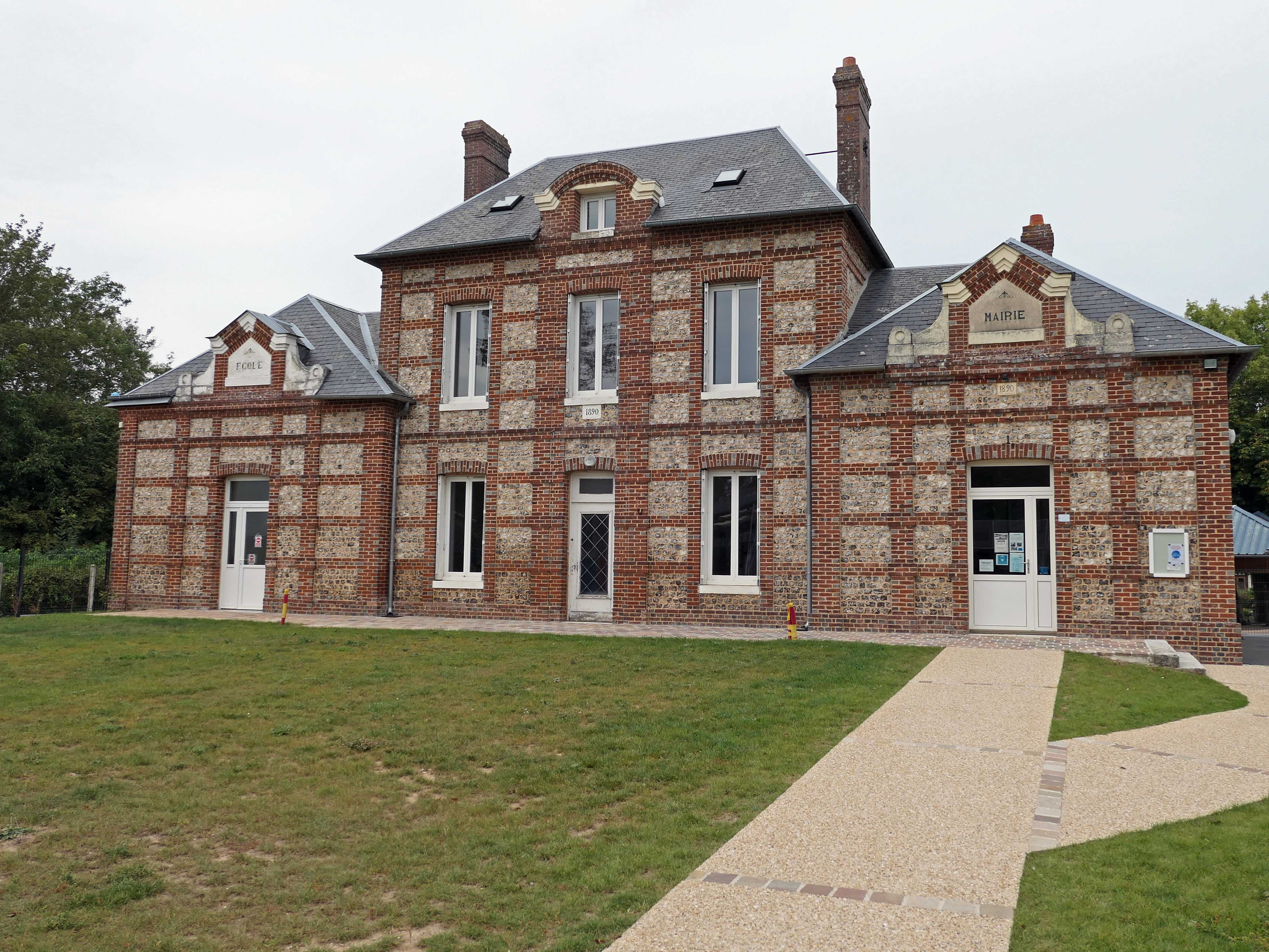
- Town hall

- Coat of arms
- Location of Gueutteville-les-Grès
- Location within France Location within Normandy
- Coordinates: 49°50′25″N 0°45′22″E
- Country: France
- Region: Normandy
- Department: Seine-Maritime
- Arrondissement: Dieppe
- Canton: Saint-Valery-en-Caux
- Intercommunality: CC Côte d'Albâtre

Government
  - Mayor (2026–32): David Lambion
- Area^{1}: 4.39 km^{2} (1.69 sq mi)
- Elevation: 80 m (260 ft)
- Highest elevation: 88 m (289 ft)
- Lowest elevation: 56 m (184 ft)
- Population (2023): 363
  - Density: 82.7/km^{2} (214/sq mi)
- Time zone: UTC+01:00 (CET)
  - Summer (DST): UTC+02:00 (CEST)
- INSEE/Postal code: 76336 /76460
- ^{1} French Land Register data, which excludes lakes, ponds, glaciers > 1 km^{2} (0.386 sq mi or 247 acres) and river estuaries.

Gueutteville-les-Grès is a commune in the Seine-Maritime department in the Normandy region in northern France.

== Geography ==
A farming village situated in the Pays de Caux, some 19 miles (31 km) southwest of Dieppe at the junction of the D69 and the D468 roads. The second part of the name comes from the sandstone (grès) quarries in the area.

== Heraldry ==
Arms of Gueutteville-les-Grès	The arms of Gueutteville-les-Grès are blazoned : Gules, a crozier and a quarryman's hammer in saltire Or, between in pale 2 saltires couped and in fess 2 bells argent.

== Population ==
Historical population
Year	Pop.	±% p.a.
1968	319	—
1975	288	−1.45%
1982	300	+0.58%
1990	332	+1.27%
1999	302	−1.05%
2007	344	+1.64%
2012	359	+0.86%
2017	370	+0.61%
2023	363	−0.32%
Source: INSEE

== Places of interest ==
- The church of St. Samson, dating from the 13th century.

== See also ==
- Communes of the Seine-Maritime department
