= Normanville, Seine-Maritime =

Normanville
- Commune
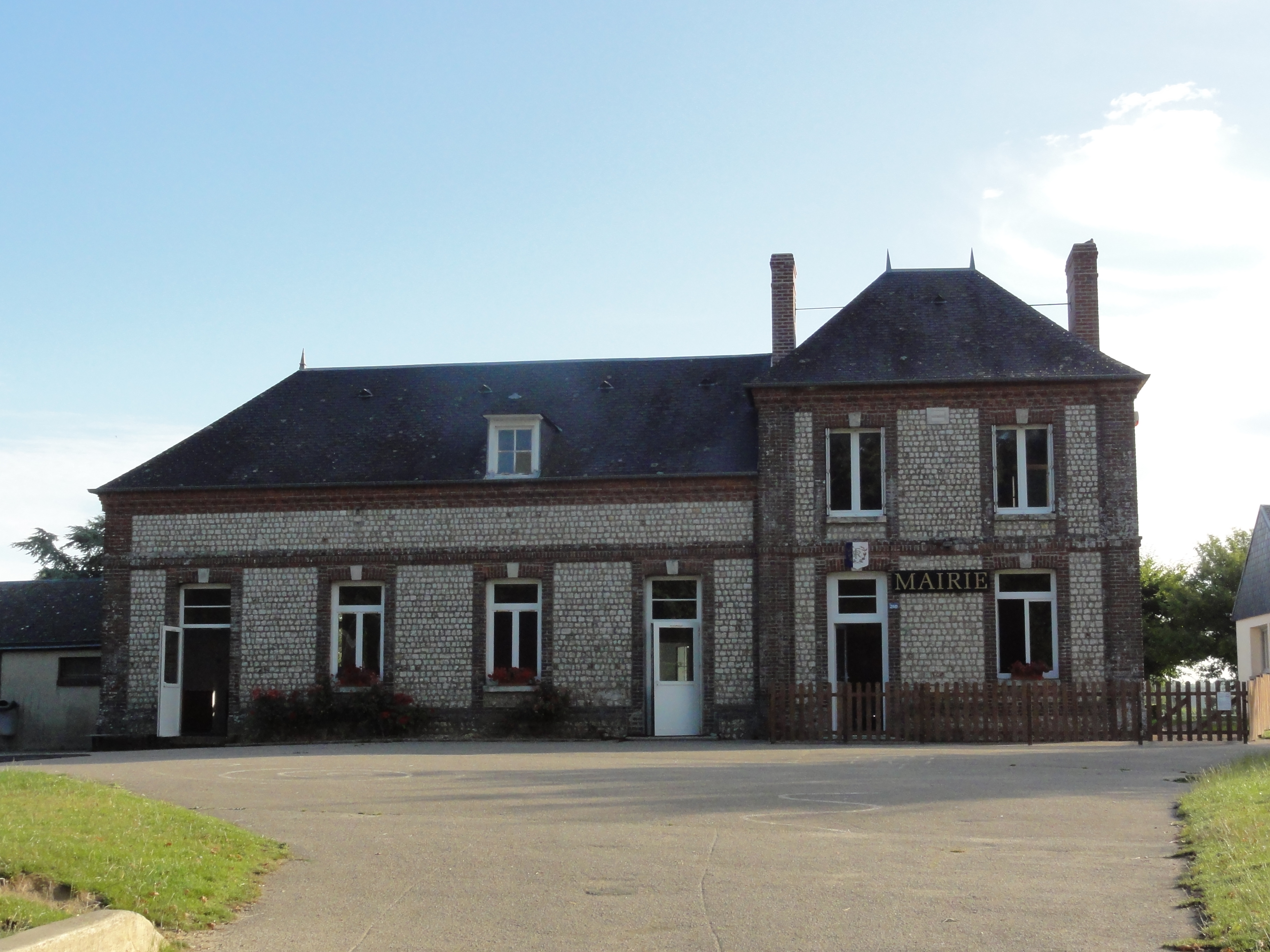
- Normanville (Seine-Mar. Town hall

- Coat of arms
- Location of Normanville
- Location within France Location within Normandy
- Coordinates: 49°41′44″N 0°35′42″E
- Country: France
- Region: Normandy
- Department: Seine-Maritime
- Arrondissement: Dieppe
- Canton: Saint-Valery-en-Caux
- Intercommunality: CC Côte d'Albâtre

Government
  - Mayor (2020–2026): Laurent Godefroy
- Area^{1}: 9.35 km^{2} (3.61 sq mi)
- Elevation: 130 m (430 ft)
- Highest elevation: 139 m (456 ft)
- Lowest elevation: 93 m (305 ft)
- Population (2023): 651
  - Density: 69.6/km^{2} (180/sq mi)
- Time zone: UTC+01:00 (CET)
  - Summer (DST): UTC+02:00 (CEST)
- INSEE/Postal code: 76470 /76640
- ^{1} French Land Register data, which excludes lakes, ponds, glaciers > 1 km^{2} (0.386 sq mi or 247 acres) and river estuaries.

Normanville (French pronunciation: [nɔʁmɑ̃vil]) is a commune in the Seine-Maritime department in the Normandy region in north-western France.

== Geography ==
A farming village in the Pays de Caux, situated some 28 miles (45 km) northeast of Le Havre, at the junction of the D50 and D33 roads.

== Heraldry ==
Arms of Normanville	The arms of Normanville are blazoned : Azure, a cross fourchée argent between 4 mullets of 6 points voided Or. (a cross fourchée in English heraldry would have the points splayed out more, but the French and English terms seem to be considered equivalent.)

== Population ==
Historical population
Year	Pop.	±% p.a.
1968	448	—
1975	422	−0.85%
1982	423	+0.03%
1990	530	+2.86%
1999	589	+1.18%
2007	578	−0.24%
2012	640	+2.06%
2017	669	+0.89%
2023	651	−0.45%
Source: INSEE

== Places of interest ==
- The church of Sts. Ouen et Barthélemy, dating from the thirteenth century.
- A fifteenth century manorhouse at Mesnil Lieubourg

== In Literature ==
- In Moose: Chapters From My Life (the 2013, posthumously published autobiography of Academy Award winning songwriter, Robert B. Sherman) World War II Normanville provides the central backdrop to the author's narrative.

== See also ==
- Communes of the Seine-Maritime department
