= Communauté de communes de la Côte d'Albâtre =

Federation of municipalities in Normandy, France

Coordinates: 49.79°N 0.64°E

Côte d'Albâtre
- Communauté de communes
- Country: France
- Region: Normandy
- Department: Seine-Maritime
- No. of communes: {{{nbcomm}}}
- Established: 28 December 2001
- Area: 387.5 km^{2} (149.6 sq mi)
- Population (2018): 27,799
  - Density: 71.74/km^{2} (185.8/sq mi)
- Website: www.cote-albatre.fr

The communauté de communes de la Côte d'Albâtre was created on December 28, 2001 and is located in the Seine-Maritime département of the Normandy region of northern France. It was enlarged with the former Communauté de communes Entre Mer et Lin and 6 communes from the former Communauté de communes Cœur de Caux on 1 January 2017. It consists of 63 communes, and its seat is in Cany-Barville. Its area is 387.5 km^{2}, and its population was 27,799 in 2018.

== Composition ==
The communauté de communes consists of the following 63 communes:

1. Ancourteville-sur-Héricourt
2. Angiens
3. Anglesqueville-la-Bras-Long
4. Auberville-la-Manuel
5. Autigny
6. Bertheauville
7. Bertreville
8. Beuzeville-la-Guérard
9. Blosseville
10. Bosville
11. Le Bourg-Dun
12. Bourville
13. Brametot
14. Butot-Vénesville
15. Cailleville
16. Canouville
17. Cany-Barville
18. La Chapelle-sur-Dun
19. Clasville
20. Cleuville
21. Crasville-la-Mallet
22. Crasville-la-Rocquefort
23. Criquetot-le-Mauconduit
24. Drosay
25. Ermenouville
26. Fontaine-le-Dun
27. La Gaillarde
28. Grainville-la-Teinturière
29. Gueutteville-les-Grès
30. Le Hanouard
31. Hautot-l'Auvray
32. Héberville
33. Houdetot
34. Ingouville
35. Malleville-les-Grès
36. Manneville-ès-Plains
37. Le Mesnil-Durdent
38. Néville
39. Normanville
40. Ocqueville
41. Oherville
42. Ouainville
43. Ourville-en-Caux
44. Paluel
45. Pleine-Sève
46. Saint-Aubin-sur-Mer
47. Sainte-Colombe
48. Saint-Martin-aux-Buneaux
49. Saint-Pierre-le-Vieux
50. Saint-Pierre-le-Viger
51. Saint-Riquier-ès-Plains
52. Saint-Sylvain
53. Saint-Vaast-Dieppedalle
54. Saint-Valery-en-Caux
55. Sasseville
56. Sommesnil
57. Sotteville-sur-Mer
58. Thiouville
59. Veauville-lès-Quelles
60. Veules-les-Roses
61. Veulettes-sur-Mer
62. Vinnemerville
63. Vittefleur

== See also ==
- Communes of the Seine-Maritime department
