= Drosay =

- Commune
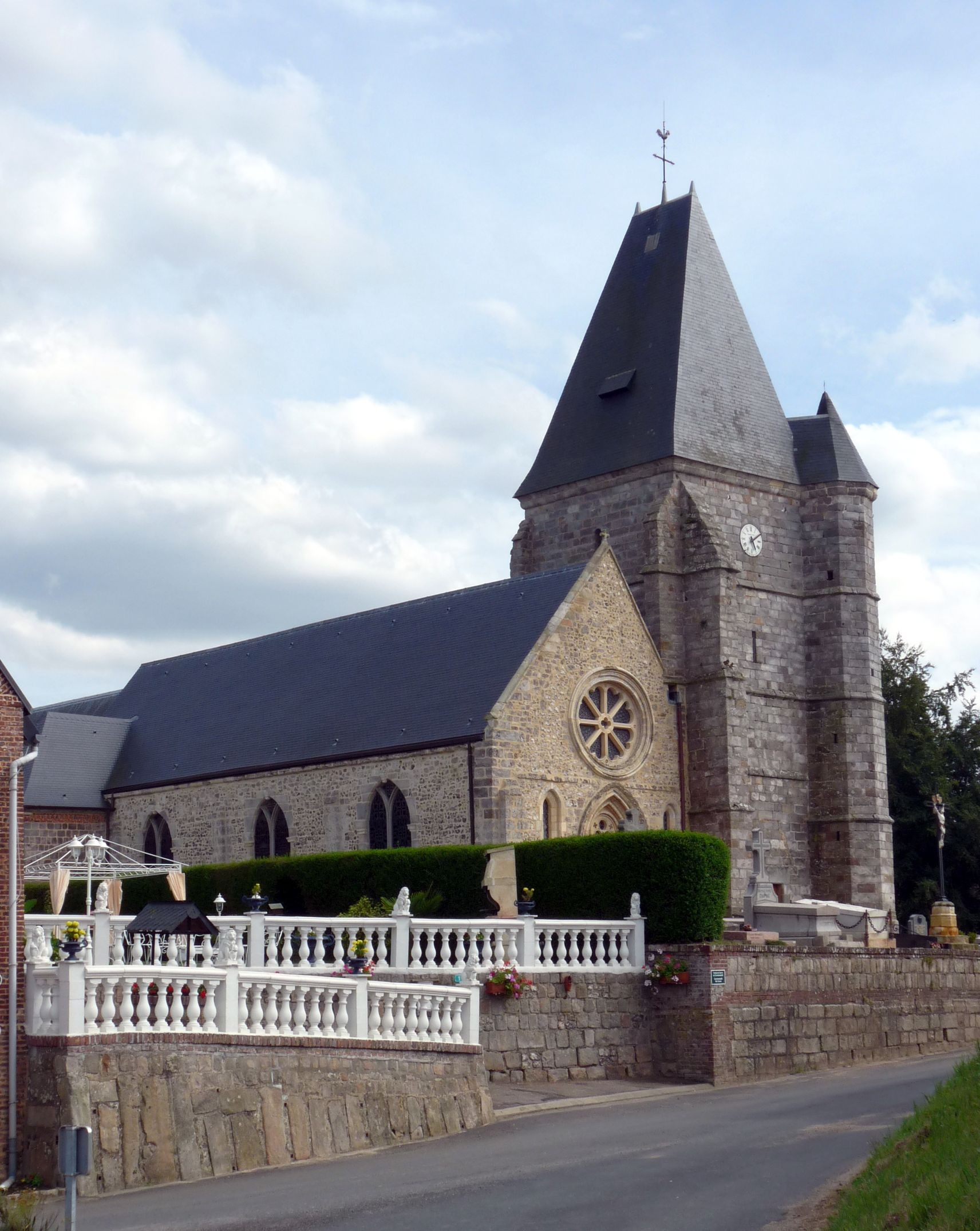
- The church in Drosay

- Coat of arms
- Location of Drosay
- Location within France Location within Normandy
- Coordinates: 49°47′42″N 0°44′29″E
- Country: France
- Region: Normandy
- Department: Seine-Maritime
- Arrondissement: Dieppe
- Canton: Saint-Valery-en-Caux
- Intercommunality: CC Côte d'Albâtre

Government
  - Mayor (2026–32): Isabelle Comont
- Area^{1}: 6.43 km^{2} (2.48 sq mi)
- Elevation: 100 m (330 ft)
- Highest elevation: 129 m (423 ft)
- Lowest elevation: 63 m (207 ft)
- Population (2023): 190
  - Density: 30/km^{2} (77/sq mi)
- Time zone: UTC+01:00 (CET)
  - Summer (DST): UTC+02:00 (CEST)
- INSEE/Postal code: 76221 /76460
- ^{1} French Land Register data, which excludes lakes, ponds, glaciers > 1 km^{2} (0.386 sq mi or 247 acres) and river estuaries.

Drosay (French pronunciation: [dʁozɛ]) is a commune in the Seine-Maritime department in the Normandy region in northern France.

== Geography ==
A small farming village situated in the Pays de Caux, some 25 miles (40 km) southwest of Dieppe, at the junction of the D75, D108 and the D107 roads.

== Population ==
Historical population
Year	Pop.	±% p.a.
1968	203	—
1975	169	−2.58%
1982	193	+1.92%
1990	174	−1.29%
1999	186	+0.74%
2007	225	+2.41%
2012	188	−3.53%
2017	198	+1.04%
2023	190	−0.69%
Source: INSEE

In 2019, the number of housing units in Drosay was 124. Of these, 76% were main residences, 18% were secondary homes, and 6% were vacant.

== Places of interest ==
- The church of St.Martin, dating from the thirteenth century.
- The chapel of St.Roch, dating from the eleventh century.

== See also ==
- Communes of the Seine-Maritime department
