= Blosseville =

- Commune
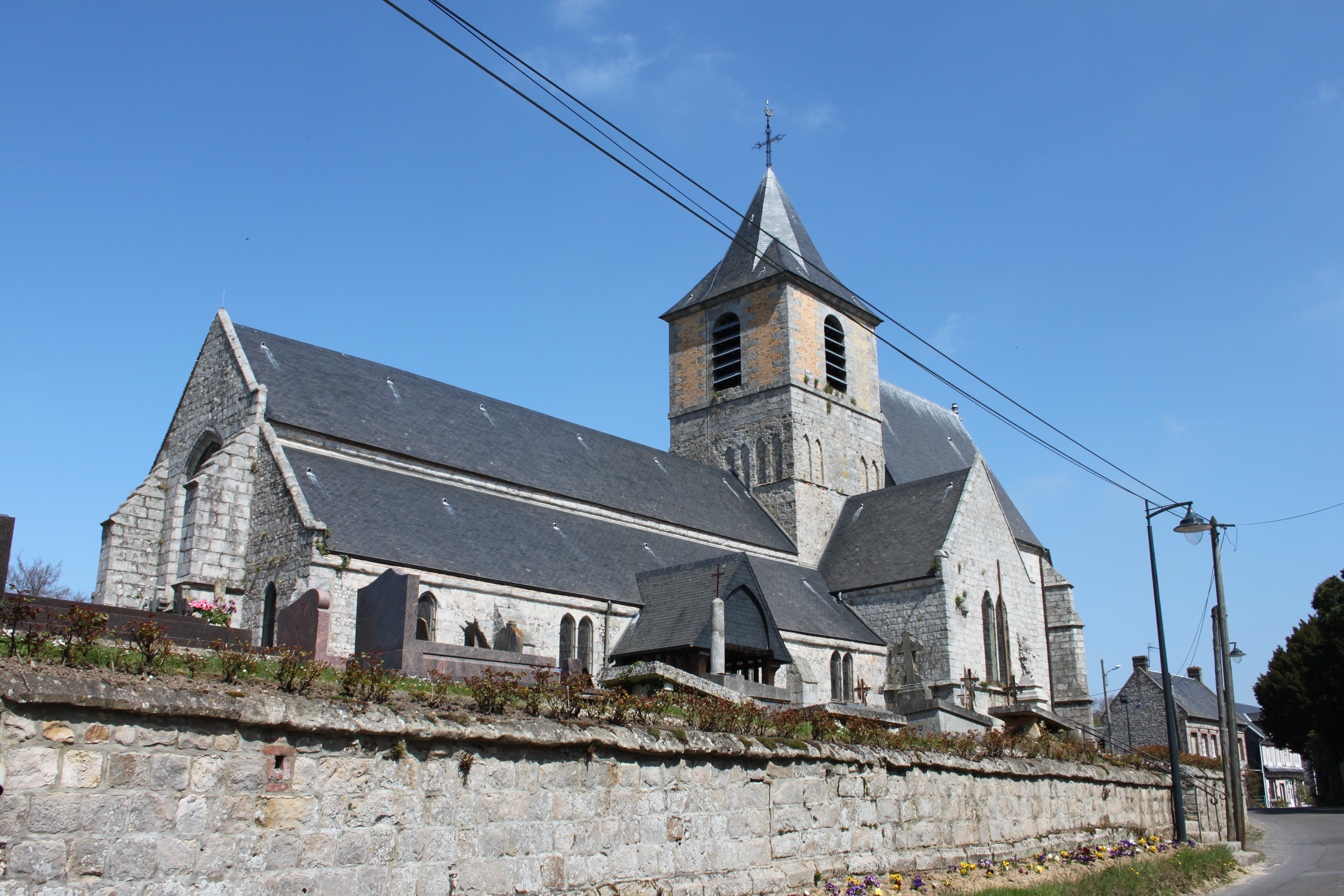
- The church in Blosseville

- Coat of arms
- Location of Blosseville
- Location within France Location within Normandy
- Coordinates: 49°51′17″N 0°47′49″E
- Country: France
- Region: Normandy
- Department: Seine-Maritime
- Arrondissement: Dieppe
- Canton: Saint-Valery-en-Caux
- Intercommunality: CC Côte d'Albâtre

Government
  - Mayor (2026–32): Pascal Vanier
- Area^{1}: 6.96 km^{2} (2.69 sq mi)
- Elevation: 80 m (260 ft)
- Highest elevation: 79 m (259 ft)
- Lowest elevation: 30 m (98 ft)
- Population (2023): 260
  - Density: 37/km^{2} (97/sq mi)
- Time zone: UTC+01:00 (CET)
  - Summer (DST): UTC+02:00 (CEST)
- INSEE/Postal code: 76104 /76460
- ^{1} French Land Register data, which excludes lakes, ponds, glaciers > 1 km^{2} (0.386 sq mi or 247 acres) and river estuaries.

Blosseville (French pronunciation: [blɔsvil]) is a commune in the Seine-Maritime department in the Normandy region in northern France.

== Geography ==
A small farming village situated in the Pays de Caux, some 15 miles (24 km) west of Dieppe, at the junction of the D69 and the D57 roads.

== Population ==
Historical population
Year	Pop.	±% p.a.
1968	278	—
1975	245	−1.79%
1982	249	+0.23%
1990	259	+0.49%
1999	275	+0.67%
2007	300	+1.09%
2012	295	−0.34%
2017	254	−2.95%
2023	260	+0.39%
Source: INSEE

== Places of interest ==
- The church of St. Martin, dating from the thirteenth century.
- The thirteenth century chapel du Val.

== See also ==
- Communes of the Seine-Maritime department
