= Ancourteville-sur-Héricourt =

- Commune
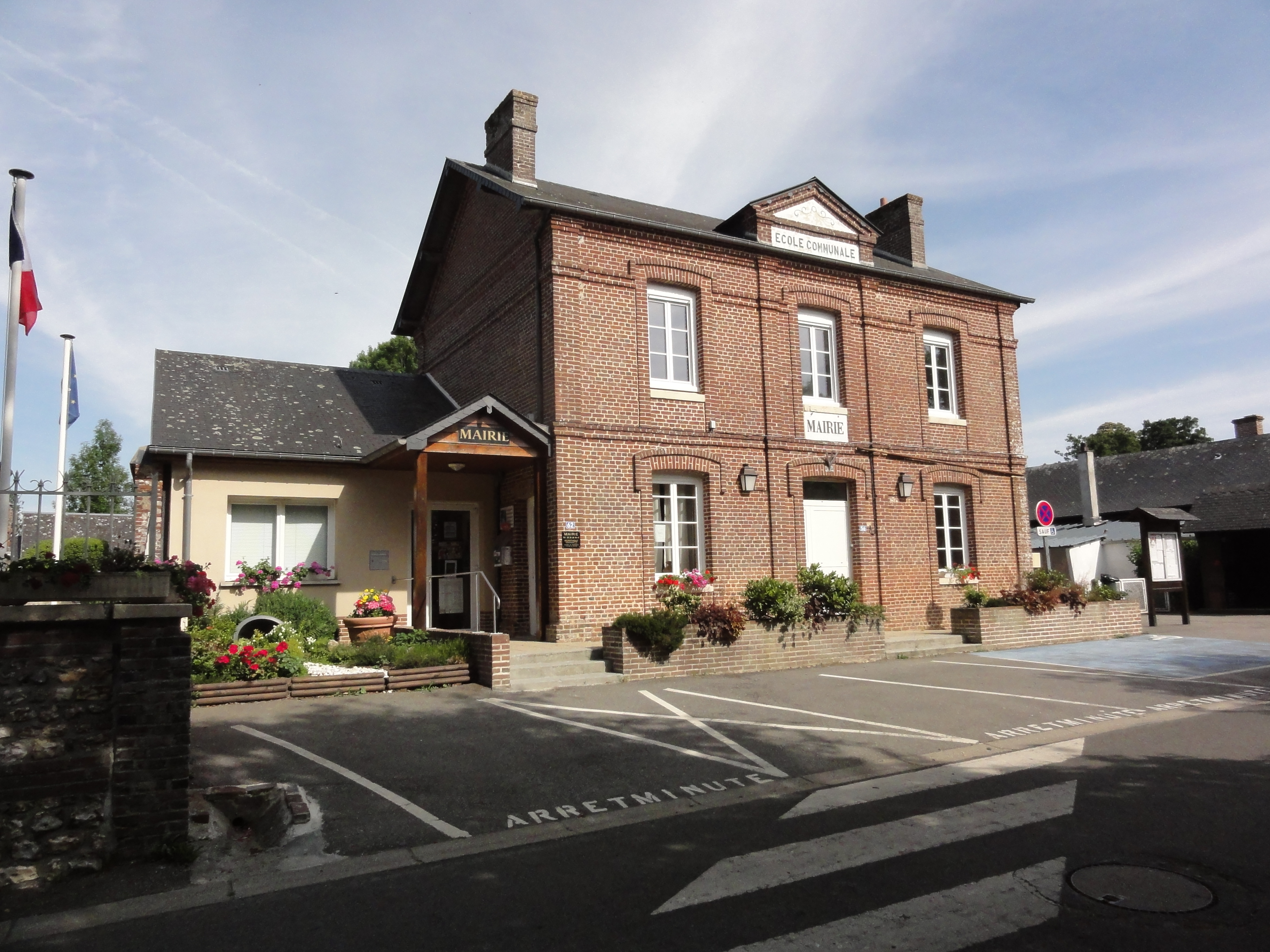
- Town hall

- Coat of arms
- Location of Ancourteville-sur-Héricourt
- Location within France Location within Normandy
- Coordinates: 49°41′49″N 0°39′53″E
- Country: France
- Region: Normandy
- Department: Seine-Maritime
- Arrondissement: Dieppe
- Canton: Saint-Valery-en-Caux
- Intercommunality: Côte d'Albâtre

Government
  - Mayor (2026–32): Magalie Legras
- Area^{1}: 3.5 km^{2} (1.4 sq mi)
- Elevation: 125 m (410 ft)
- Highest elevation: 139 m (456 ft)
- Lowest elevation: 84 m (276 ft)
- Population (2023): 354
  - Density: 100/km^{2} (260/sq mi)
- Time zone: UTC+01:00 (CET)
  - Summer (DST): UTC+02:00 (CEST)
- INSEE/Postal code: 76009 /76560
- ^{1} French Land Register data, which excludes lakes, ponds, glaciers > 1 km^{2} (0.386 sq mi or 247 acres) and river estuaries.

Ancourteville-sur-Héricourt (French pronunciation: [ɑ̃kuʁtəvil syʁ eʁikuʁ], lit. 'Ancourteville on Héricourt') is a commune in the Seine-Maritime department in the Normandy region in northern France.

== Geography ==
A small farming village situated some 23 miles (37 km) northeast of Le Havre, at the junction of the D233 and the D105.

== Population ==
Historical population
Year	Pop.	±% p.a.
1968	163	—
1975	152	−0.99%
1982	201	+4.07%
1990	227	+1.53%
1999	218	−0.45%
2007	217	−0.06%
2012	288	+5.82%
2017	333	+2.95%
2023	354	+1.02%
Source: INSEE

== Places of interest ==
- The church of Sainte-Marie, dating from the eighteenth century
- A sixteenth-century stone cross.

== See also ==
- Communes of the Seine-Maritime department
