= Saint-Riquier-ès-Plains =

- Commune
- Location of Saint-Riquier-ès-Plains
- Location within France Location within Normandy
- Coordinates: 49°49′28″N 0°40′02″E
- Country: France
- Region: Normandy
- Department: Seine-Maritime
- Arrondissement: Dieppe
- Canton: Saint-Valery-en-Caux
- Intercommunality: CC Côte d'Albâtre

Government
  - Mayor (2020–2026): Patrick Victor
- Area^{1}: 6.22 km^{2} (2.40 sq mi)
- Elevation: 90 m (300 ft)
- Highest elevation: 96 m (315 ft)
- Lowest elevation: 35 m (115 ft)
- Population (2023): 636
  - Density: 102/km^{2} (265/sq mi)
- Time zone: UTC+01:00 (CET)
  - Summer (DST): UTC+02:00 (CEST)
- INSEE/Postal code: 76646 /76460
- ^{1} French Land Register data, which excludes lakes, ponds, glaciers > 1 km^{2} (0.386 sq mi or 247 acres) and river estuaries.

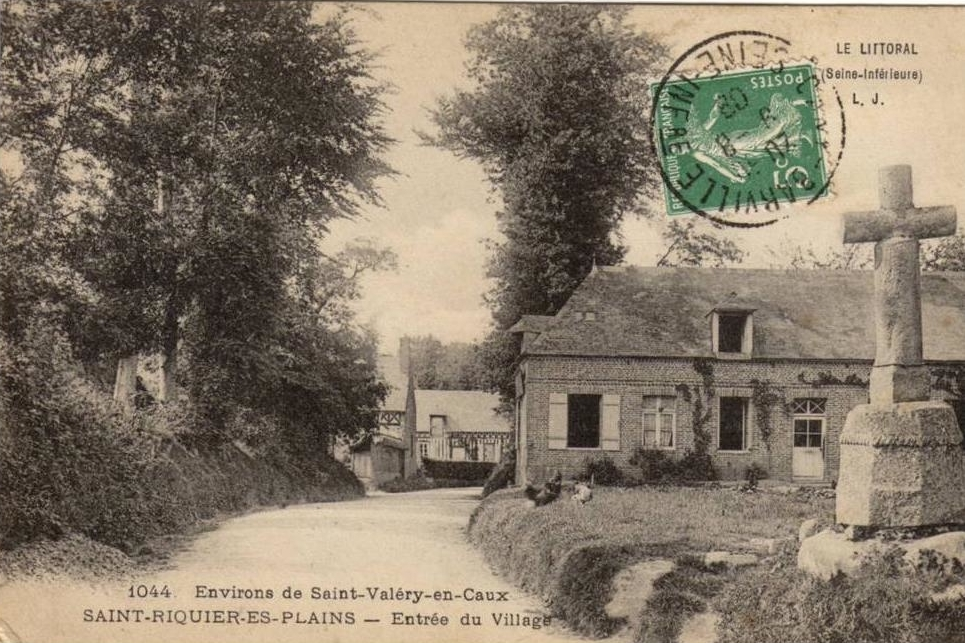
Saint-Riquier-ès-Plains Carte postale

Saint-Riquier-ès-Plains is a commune in the Seine-Maritime department in the Normandy region in northern France.

== Geography ==
A farming village situated in the Pays de Caux, some 24 miles (39 km) southwest of Dieppe at the junction of the D69, D269 and the D925 roads.

== Population ==
Historical population
Year	Pop.	±% p.a.
1968	335	—
1975	310	−1.10%
1982	459	+5.77%
1990	513	+1.40%
1999	578	+1.33%
2007	592	+0.30%
2012	585	−0.24%
2017	585	+0.00%
2023	636	+1.40%
Source: INSEE

== Places of interest ==
- The church of St.Riquier, dating from the fourteenth century.

== See also ==
- Communes of the Seine-Maritime department
