= Malleville-les-Grès =

- Commune
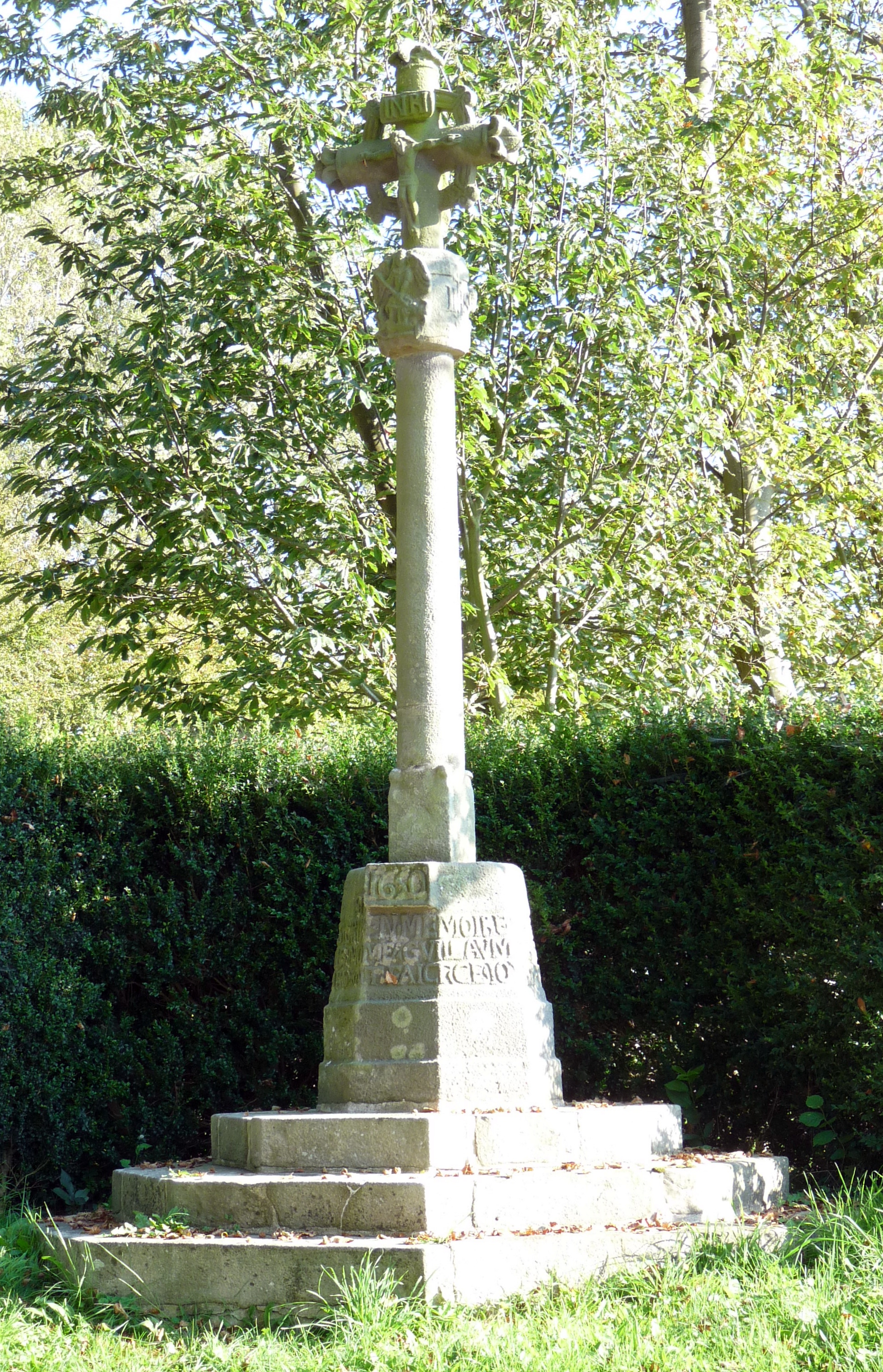
- The cross in Malleville

- Coat of arms
- Location of Malleville-les-Grès
- Location within France Location within Normandy
- Coordinates: 49°49′51″N 0°36′27″E
- Country: France
- Region: Normandy
- Department: Seine-Maritime
- Arrondissement: Dieppe
- Canton: Saint-Valery-en-Caux
- Intercommunality: CC Côte d'Albâtre

Government
  - Mayor (2026–32): Francis Rousselet
- Area^{1}: 3.06 km^{2} (1.18 sq mi)
- Elevation: 80 m (260 ft)
- Highest elevation: 86 m (282 ft)
- Lowest elevation: 5 m (16 ft)
- Population (2023): 203
  - Density: 66.3/km^{2} (172/sq mi)
- Time zone: UTC+01:00 (CET)
  - Summer (DST): UTC+02:00 (CEST)
- INSEE/Postal code: 76403 /76450
- ^{1} French Land Register data, which excludes lakes, ponds, glaciers > 1 km^{2} (0.386 sq mi or 247 acres) and river estuaries.

Malleville-les-Grès is a commune in the Seine-Maritime department in the Normandy region in northern France.

== Geography ==
A small farming village situated by the banks of the river Durdent in the Pays de Caux, some 24 miles (39 km) southwest of Dieppe at the junction of the D271 and the D68 roads.

== Population ==
Historical population
Year	Pop.	±% p.a.
1968	122	—
1975	96	−3.37%
1982	144	+5.96%
1990	158	+1.17%
1999	141	−1.26%
2007	158	+1.43%
2012	152	−0.77%
2017	202	+5.85%
2023	203	+0.08%
Source: INSEE

== Places of interest ==
- The church of St.Michel, dating from the sixteenth century.
- A sixteenth-century stone cross.

== See also ==
- Communes of the Seine-Maritime department
