= Crasville-la-Mallet =

- Commune
- Coat of arms
- Location of Crasville-la-Mallet
- Location within France Location within Normandy
- Coordinates: 49°48′15″N 0°42′49″E
- Country: France
- Region: Normandy
- Department: Seine-Maritime
- Arrondissement: Dieppe
- Canton: Saint-Valery-en-Caux
- Intercommunality: CC Côte d'Albâtre

Government
  - Mayor (2026–32): Eric Simon
- Area^{1}: 3.21 km^{2} (1.24 sq mi)
- Elevation: 80 m (260 ft)
- Highest elevation: 105 m (344 ft)
- Lowest elevation: 65 m (213 ft)
- Population (2023): 189
  - Density: 58.9/km^{2} (152/sq mi)
- Time zone: UTC+01:00 (CET)
  - Summer (DST): UTC+02:00 (CEST)
- INSEE/Postal code: 76189 /76450
- ^{1} French Land Register data, which excludes lakes, ponds, glaciers > 1 km^{2} (0.386 sq mi or 247 acres) and river estuaries.

Crasville-la-Mallet is a commune in the Seine-Maritime department in the Normandy region in northern France.

== Geography ==
A small farming village situated in the Pays de Caux, some 20 miles (32 km) southwest of Dieppe, at the junction of the D53 and the D70 roads.

== Population ==
Historical population
Year	Pop.	±% p.a.
1968	169	—
1975	148	−1.88%
1982	129	−1.94%
1990	132	+0.29%
1999	133	+0.08%
2007	161	+2.42%
2012	166	+0.61%
2017	154	−1.49%
2023	189	+3.47%
Source: INSEE

== Places of interest ==
- The church of St.Vaast, dating from the sixteenth century.
- The chapel at the hamlet of Pleine-Sevette.
- A sixteenth-century stone cross.

== See also ==
- Communes of the Seine-Maritime department
