= Bertheauville =

- Commune
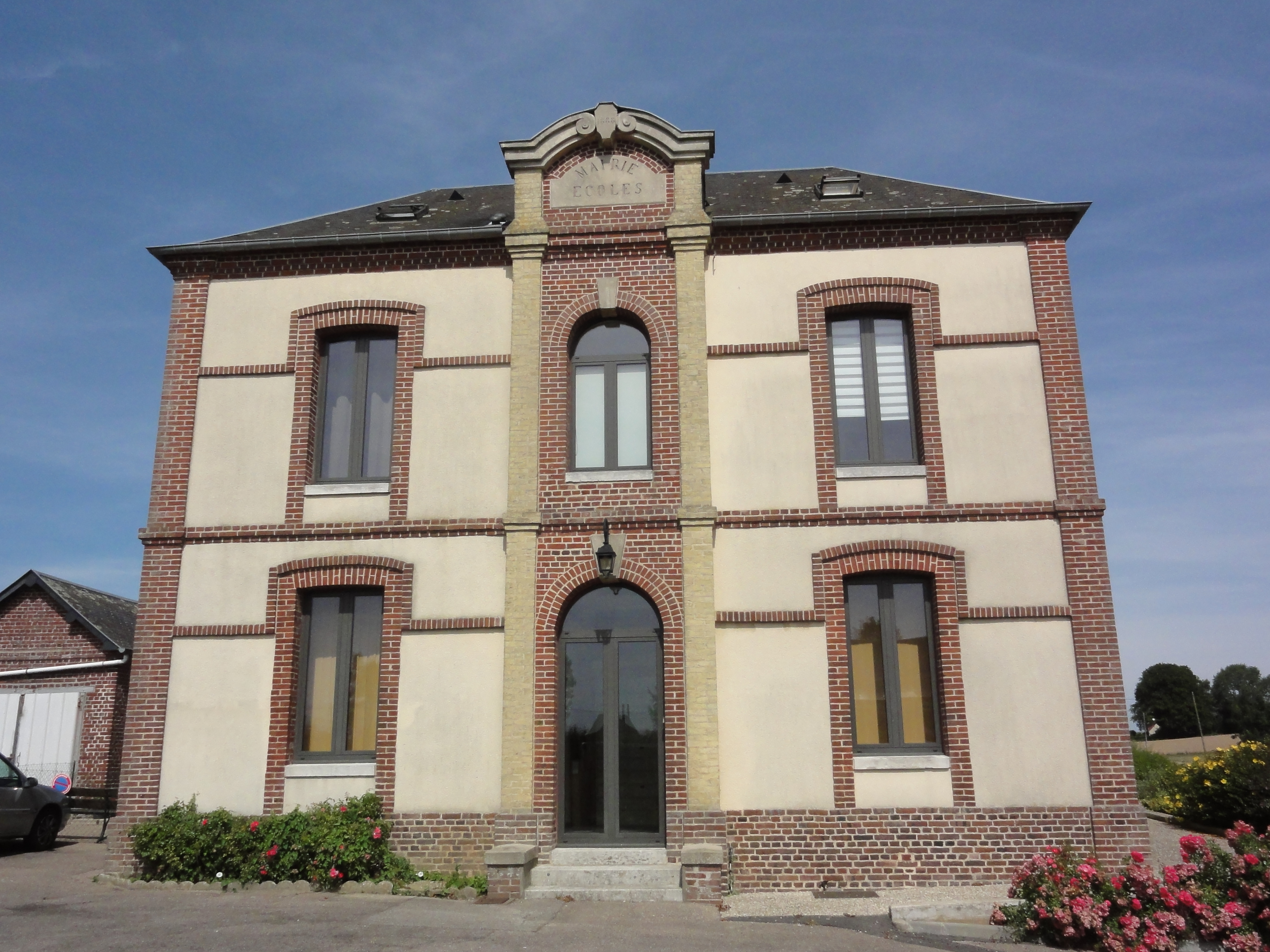
- Bertheauville Town hall

- Coat of arms
- Location of Bertheauville
- Location within France Location within Normandy
- Coordinates: 49°45′20″N 0°35′44″E
- Country: France
- Region: Normandy
- Department: Seine-Maritime
- Arrondissement: Dieppe
- Canton: Saint-Valery-en-Caux
- Intercommunality: CC Côte d'Albâtre

Government
  - Mayor (2026–32): Véronique Izabelle
- Area^{1}: 2.43 km^{2} (0.94 sq mi)
- Elevation: 110 m (360 ft)
- Highest elevation: 120 m (390 ft)
- Lowest elevation: 49 m (161 ft)
- Population (2023): 103
  - Density: 42.4/km^{2} (110/sq mi)
- Time zone: UTC+01:00 (CET)
  - Summer (DST): UTC+02:00 (CEST)
- INSEE/Postal code: 76083 /76450
- ^{1} French Land Register data, which excludes lakes, ponds, glaciers > 1 km^{2} (0.386 sq mi or 247 acres) and river estuaries.

Bertheauville (French pronunciation: [bɛʁtovil]) is a commune in the Seine-Maritime department in the Normandy region in northern France.

== Geography ==
A very small farming village in the Pays de Caux, situated some 27 miles (43 km) southwest of Dieppe, at the junction of the D10 and D210 roads.

== Population ==
Historical population
Year	Pop.	±% p.a.
1968	115	—
1975	84	−4.39%
1982	60	−4.69%
1990	75	+2.83%
1999	85	+1.40%
2007	120	+4.40%
2012	112	−1.37%
2017	106	−1.10%
2023	103	−0.48%
Source: INSEE

== Places of interest ==
- The church of Notre-Dame, built in the 18th century.

== See also ==
- Communes of the Seine-Maritime department
