= Bosville =

- Commune
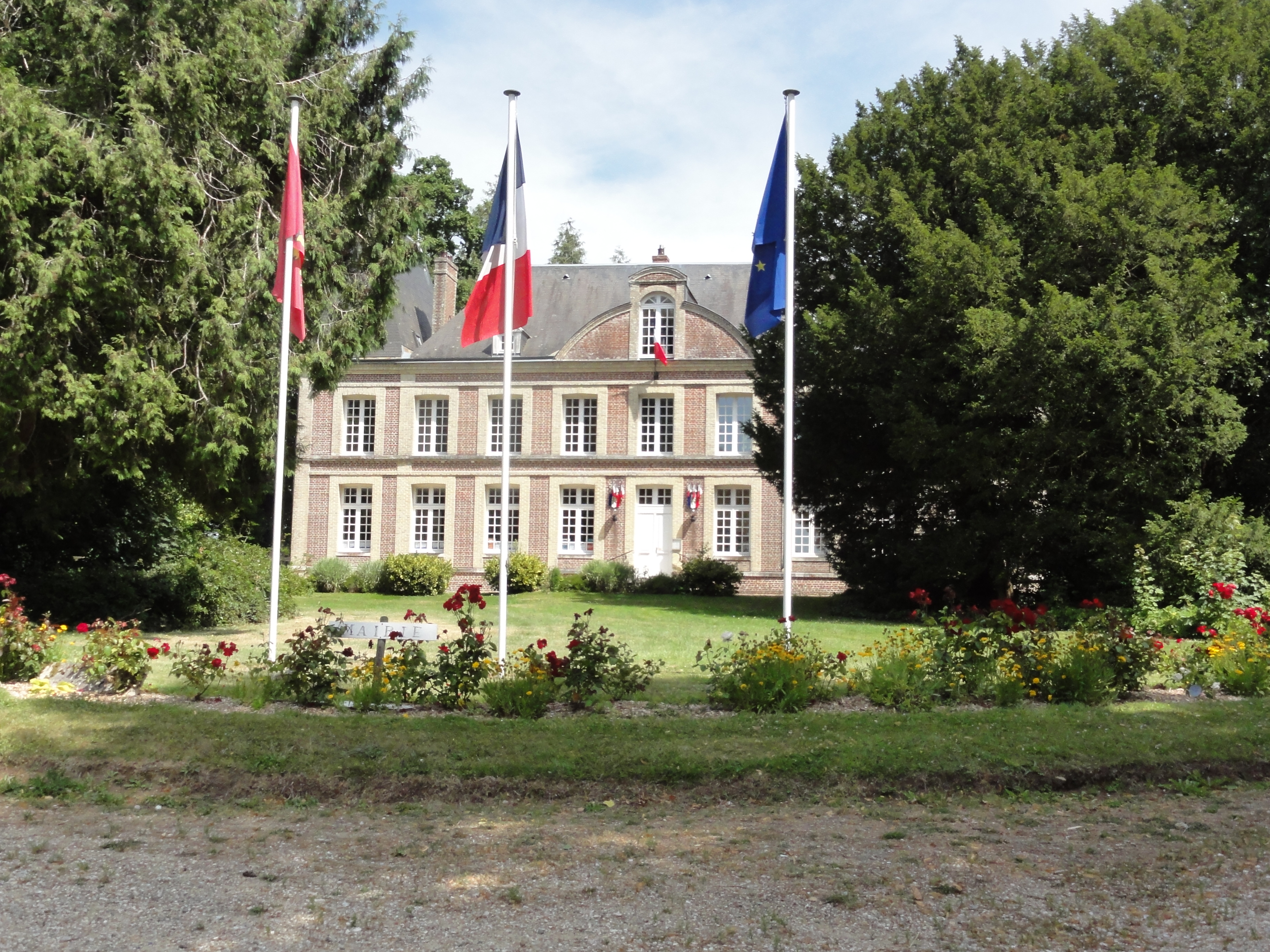
- Bosville Town hall

- Coat of arms
- Location of Bosville
- Location within France Location within Normandy
- Coordinates: 49°45′23″N 0°41′24″E
- Country: France
- Region: Normandy
- Department: Seine-Maritime
- Arrondissement: Dieppe
- Canton: Saint-Valery-en-Caux
- Intercommunality: CC Côte d'Albâtre
- Area^{1}: 8.69 km^{2} (3.36 sq mi)
- Elevation: 91 m (299 ft)
- Highest elevation: 124 m (407 ft)
- Lowest elevation: 50 m (160 ft)
- Population (2023): 584
  - Density: 67.2/km^{2} (174/sq mi)
- Time zone: UTC+01:00 (CET)
  - Summer (DST): UTC+02:00 (CEST)
- INSEE/Postal code: 76128 /76450
- ^{1} French Land Register data, which excludes lakes, ponds, glaciers > 1 km^{2} (0.386 sq mi or 247 acres) and river estuaries.

Bosville is a commune in the Seine-Maritime department in the Normandy region in northern France.

== Geography ==
A farming village situated in the Pays de Caux, some 25 miles (40 km) southwest of Dieppe, at the junction of the D75, D88 and the D250 roads.

== Population ==
Historical population
Year	Pop.	±% p.a.
1968	571	—
1975	470	−2.74%
1982	457	−0.40%
1990	437	−0.56%
1999	512	+1.78%
2007	535	+0.55%
2012	561	+0.95%
2017	579	+0.63%
2023	584	+0.14%
Source: INSEE

== Places of interest ==
- The church of St.Samson, dating from the twelfth century.
- The chapel at a farm.

== See also ==
- Communes of the Seine-Maritime department
