= Auberville-la-Manuel =

- Commune
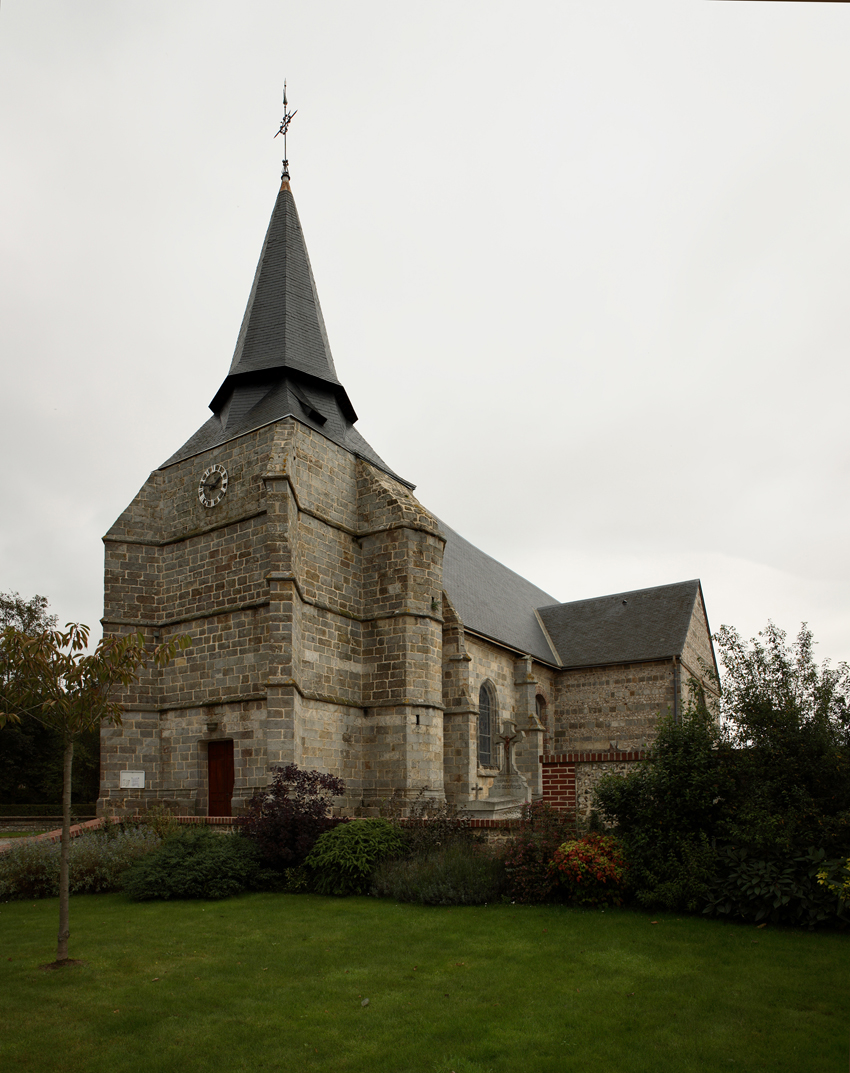
- The church in Auberville-la-Manuel

- Coat of arms
- Location of Auberville-la-Manuel
- Location within France Location within Normandy
- Coordinates: 49°49′43″N 0°35′22″E
- Country: France
- Region: Normandy
- Department: Seine-Maritime
- Arrondissement: Dieppe
- Canton: Saint-Valery-en-Caux
- Intercommunality: CC Côte Albâtre

Government
  - Mayor (2026–32): Damien Hue
- Area^{1}: 3.02 km^{2} (1.17 sq mi)
- Elevation: 80 m (260 ft)
- Highest elevation: 85 m (279 ft)
- Lowest elevation: 23 m (75 ft)
- Population (2023): 138
  - Density: 45.7/km^{2} (118/sq mi)
- Time zone: UTC+01:00 (CET)
  - Summer (DST): UTC+02:00 (CEST)
- INSEE/Postal code: 76032 /76450
- ^{1} French Land Register data, which excludes lakes, ponds, glaciers > 1 km^{2} (0.386 sq mi or 247 acres) and river estuaries.

Auberville-la-Manuel (French pronunciation: [obɛʁvil la manɥɛl]) is a commune in the Seine-Maritime department in the Normandy region in northern France.

== Population ==
Historical population
Year	Pop.	±% p.a.
1968	207	—
1975	166	−3.10%
1982	145	−1.91%
1990	127	−1.64%
1999	103	−2.30%
2007	121	+2.03%
2012	118	−0.50%
2017	130	+1.96%
2023	138	+1.00%
Source: INSEE

== See also ==
- Communes of the Seine-Maritime department
