= Ocqueville =

- Commune
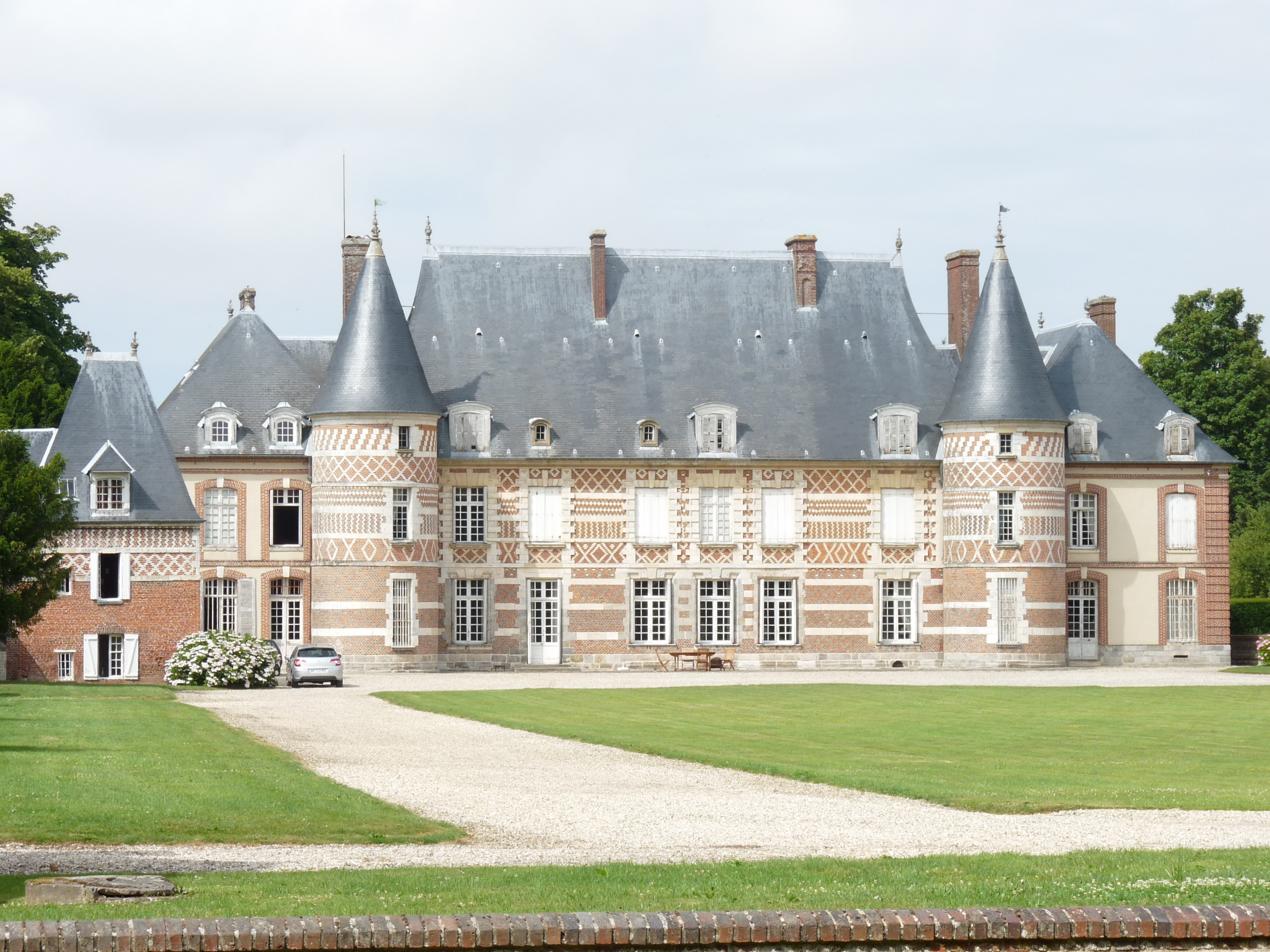
- The chateau of Catteville

- Coat of arms
- Location of Ocqueville
- Location within France Location within Normandy
- Coordinates: 49°48′05″N 0°41′19″E
- Country: France
- Region: Normandy
- Department: Seine-Maritime
- Arrondissement: Dieppe
- Canton: Saint-Valery-en-Caux
- Intercommunality: CC Côte d'Albâtre

Government
  - Mayor (2026–32): Jean-Robert Lanchon
- Area^{1}: 8.91 km^{2} (3.44 sq mi)
- Elevation: 105 m (344 ft)
- Highest elevation: 121 m (397 ft)
- Lowest elevation: 58 m (190 ft)
- Population (2023): 431
  - Density: 48.4/km^{2} (125/sq mi)
- Time zone: UTC+01:00 (CET)
  - Summer (DST): UTC+02:00 (CEST)
- INSEE/Postal code: 76480 /76450
- ^{1} French Land Register data, which excludes lakes, ponds, glaciers > 1 km^{2} (0.386 sq mi or 247 acres) and river estuaries.

Ocqueville (French pronunciation: [ɔkvil]) is a commune in the Seine-Maritime department in the Normandy region in northern France.

== Geography ==
A farming village situated in the Pays de Caux at the junction of the D105 and the D70 roads, some 23 miles (37 km) southwest of Dieppe.

== Population ==
Historical population
Year	Pop.	±% p.a.
1968	355	—
1975	290	−2.85%
1982	342	+2.38%
1990	378	+1.26%
1999	446	+1.86%
2007	451	+0.14%
2012	459	+0.35%
2017	449	−0.44%
2023	431	−0.68%
Source: INSEE

== Places of interest ==
- The château de Catteville, dating from the fifteenth century.
- The château du Merdon.
- The church of St. Vaast, dating from the thirteenth century.
- A sixteenth-century stone cross.

== See also ==
- Communes of the Seine-Maritime department
