= Saint-Sylvain, Seine-Maritime =

Saint-Sylvain
- Commune
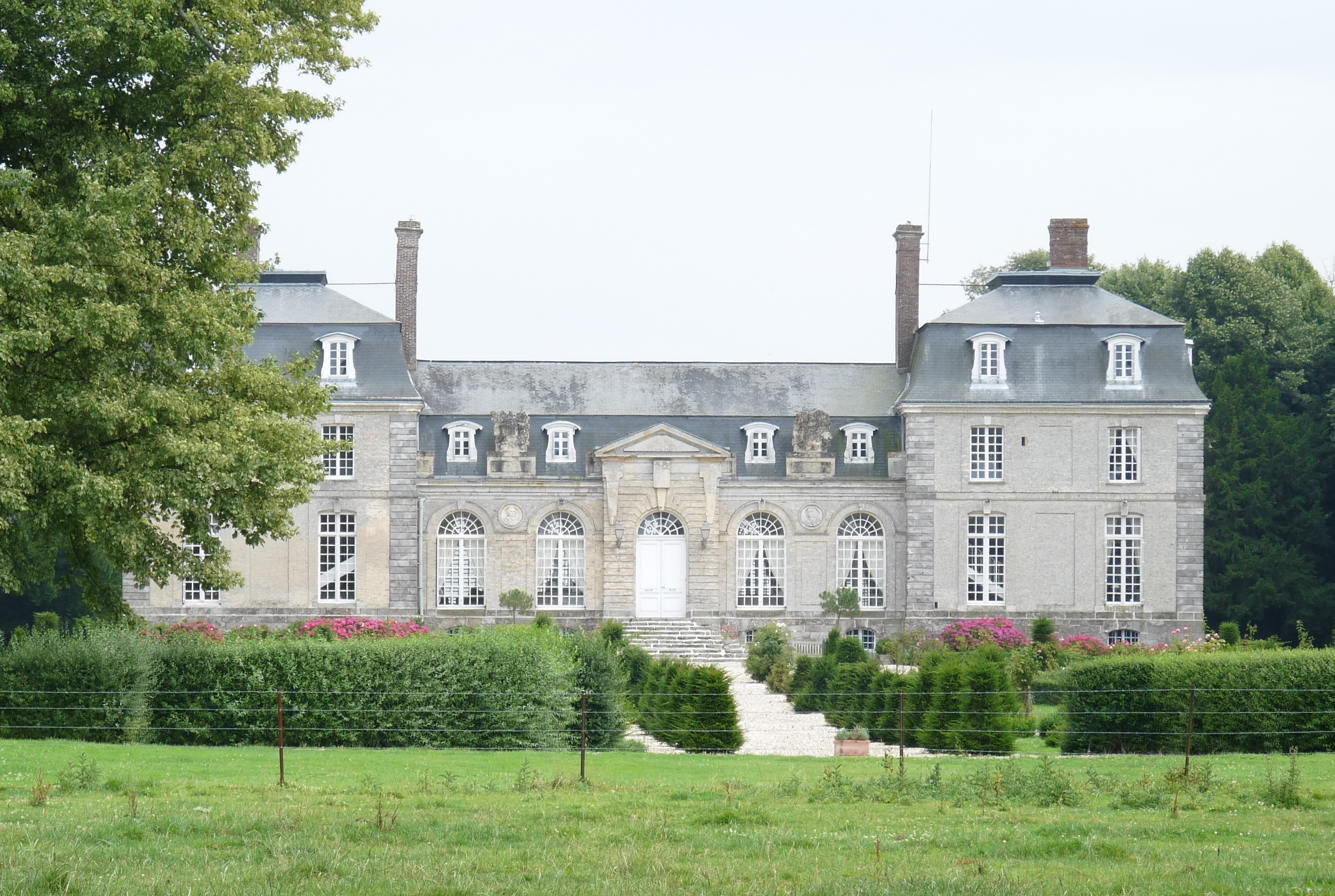
- The chateau of Anglesqueville-les-Murs

- Coat of arms
- Location of Saint-Sylvain
- Location within France Location within Normandy
- Coordinates: 49°50′47″N 0°40′25″E
- Country: France
- Region: Normandy
- Department: Seine-Maritime
- Arrondissement: Dieppe
- Canton: Saint-Valery-en-Caux
- Intercommunality: CC Côte d'Albâtre

Government
  - Mayor (2026–32): Sandrine Losay-Annebique
- Area^{1}: 3.24 km^{2} (1.25 sq mi)
- Elevation: 70 m (230 ft)
- Highest elevation: 83 m (272 ft)
- Lowest elevation: 0 m (0 ft)
- Population (2023): 133
  - Density: 41.0/km^{2} (106/sq mi)
- Time zone: UTC+01:00 (CET)
  - Summer (DST): UTC+02:00 (CEST)
- INSEE/Postal code: 76651 /76460
- ^{1} French Land Register data, which excludes lakes, ponds, glaciers > 1 km^{2} (0.386 sq mi or 247 acres) and river estuaries.

Saint-Sylvain (French pronunciation: [sɛ̃ silvɛ̃]) is a commune in the Seine-Maritime department in the Normandy region in northern France.

== Geography ==
A small farming village situated in the Pays de Caux, some 24 miles (39 km) west of Dieppe at the junction of the D68 and the D105 roads. Huge chalk cliffs rise up from the pebbly beach and overlook the English Channel, forming the northern border of the commune's territory.

== Heraldry ==
Arms of Saint-Sylvain	The arms of Saint-Martin-Sylvain are blazoned : Azure, a chevron Or semy of trefoils between 2 lances and a man's head argent, and on a chief argent a lion between 2 hammers gules.

== Population ==
Historical population
Year	Pop.	±% p.a.
1968	191	—
1975	157	−2.76%
1982	178	+1.81%
1990	223	+2.86%
1999	212	−0.56%
2007	178	−2.16%
2012	183	+0.56%
2017	179	−0.44%
2023	133	−4.83%
Source: INSEE

== Places of interest ==
- The church of St.Silvain, dating from the thirteenth century.
- A sixteenth-century stone cross.
- The thirteenth-century château of Anglesqueville-les-Mur.

== See also ==
- Communes of the Seine-Maritime department
