= Saint-Vaast-Dieppedalle =

- Commune
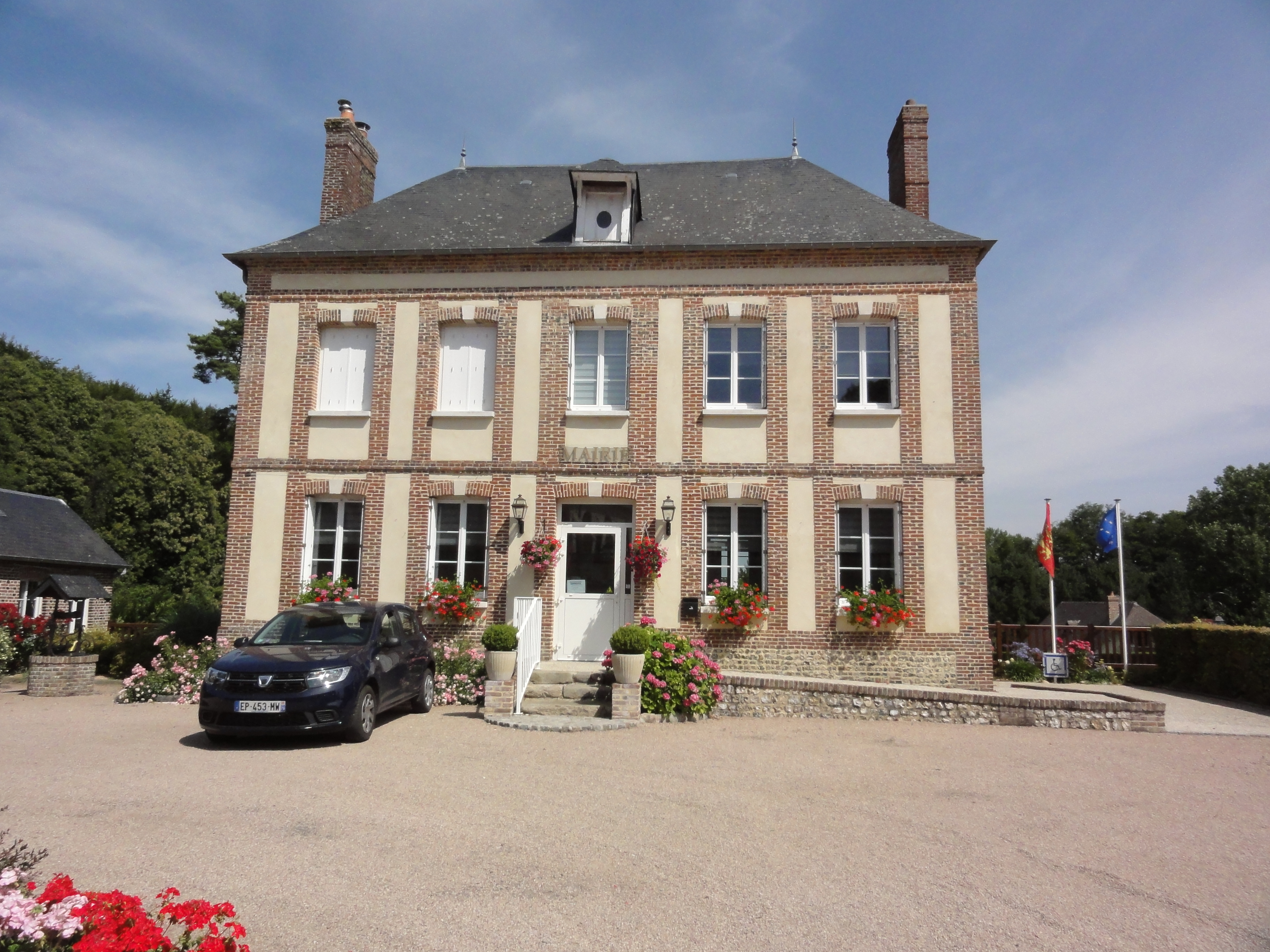
- Town hall of Saint-Vaast-Dieppedalle

- Coat of arms
- Location of Saint-Vaast-Dieppedalle
- Location within France Location within Normandy
- Coordinates: 49°45′21″N 0°43′25″E
- Country: France
- Region: Normandy
- Department: Seine-Maritime
- Arrondissement: Dieppe
- Canton: Saint-Valery-en-Caux
- Intercommunality: CC Côte d'Albâtre

Government
  - Mayor (2026–32): Sylvain Monnier
- Area^{1}: 12.15 km^{2} (4.69 sq mi)
- Elevation: 118 m (387 ft)
- Highest elevation: 138 m (453 ft)
- Lowest elevation: 61 m (200 ft)
- Population (2023): 379
  - Density: 31.2/km^{2} (80.8/sq mi)
- Time zone: UTC+01:00 (CET)
  - Summer (DST): UTC+02:00 (CEST)
- INSEE/Postal code: 76653 /76450
- ^{1} French Land Register data, which excludes lakes, ponds, glaciers > 1 km^{2} (0.386 sq mi or 247 acres) and river estuaries.

Saint-Vaast-Dieppedalle is a commune in the Seine-Maritime department in the Normandy region in northern France.

== Geography ==
A small farming village in the Pays de Caux, situated some 34 miles (55 km) northeast of Le Havre, at the junction of the D53, D420 and D250 roads.

== Population ==
Historical population
Year	Pop.	±% p.a.
1968	395	—
1975	335	−2.33%
1982	332	−0.13%
1990	336	+0.15%
1999	323	−0.44%
2007	338	+0.57%
2012	359	+1.21%
2017	368	+0.50%
2023	379	+0.49%
Source: INSEE

== Places of interest ==
- The sixteenth century church of St.Vaast.
- The stone cross, dating from the sixteenth century.

== See also ==
- Communes of the Seine-Maritime department
