= Butot-Vénesville =

- Commune
- Coat of arms
- Location of Butot-Vénesville
- Location within France Location within Normandy
- Coordinates: 49°48′54″N 0°35′21″E
- Country: France
- Region: Normandy
- Department: Seine-Maritime
- Arrondissement: Dieppe
- Canton: Saint-Valery-en-Caux
- Intercommunality: CC Côte d'Albâtre

Government
  - Mayor (2026–32): Alexandra Buquet
- Area^{1}: 3.51 km^{2} (1.36 sq mi)
- Elevation: 65 m (213 ft)
- Highest elevation: 96 m (315 ft)
- Lowest elevation: 43 m (141 ft)
- Population (2023): 230
  - Density: 66/km^{2} (170/sq mi)
- Time zone: UTC+01:00 (CET)
  - Summer (DST): UTC+02:00 (CEST)
- INSEE/Postal code: 76732 /76450
- ^{1} French Land Register data, which excludes lakes, ponds, glaciers > 1 km^{2} (0.386 sq mi or 247 acres) and river estuaries.

Butot-Vénesville is a commune in the Seine-Maritime department in the Normandy region in northern France.

== Geography ==
A farming village situated in the Pays de Caux, some 30 miles (48 km) southwest of Dieppe, on the D71 road.

== Population ==
Historical population
Year	Pop.	±% p.a.
1968	203	—
1975	168	−2.67%
1982	197	+2.30%
1990	234	+2.17%
1999	272	+1.69%
2007	272	+0.00%
2012	246	−1.99%
2017	247	+0.08%
2023	230	−1.18%
Source: INSEE

== Places of interest ==
- The church of Notre-Dame, dating from the sixteenth century.
- The church of St. Amand &St.Mathurin, also dating from the sixteenth century.

== See also ==
- Communes of the Seine-Maritime department
