= Veauville-lès-Quelles =

- Commune
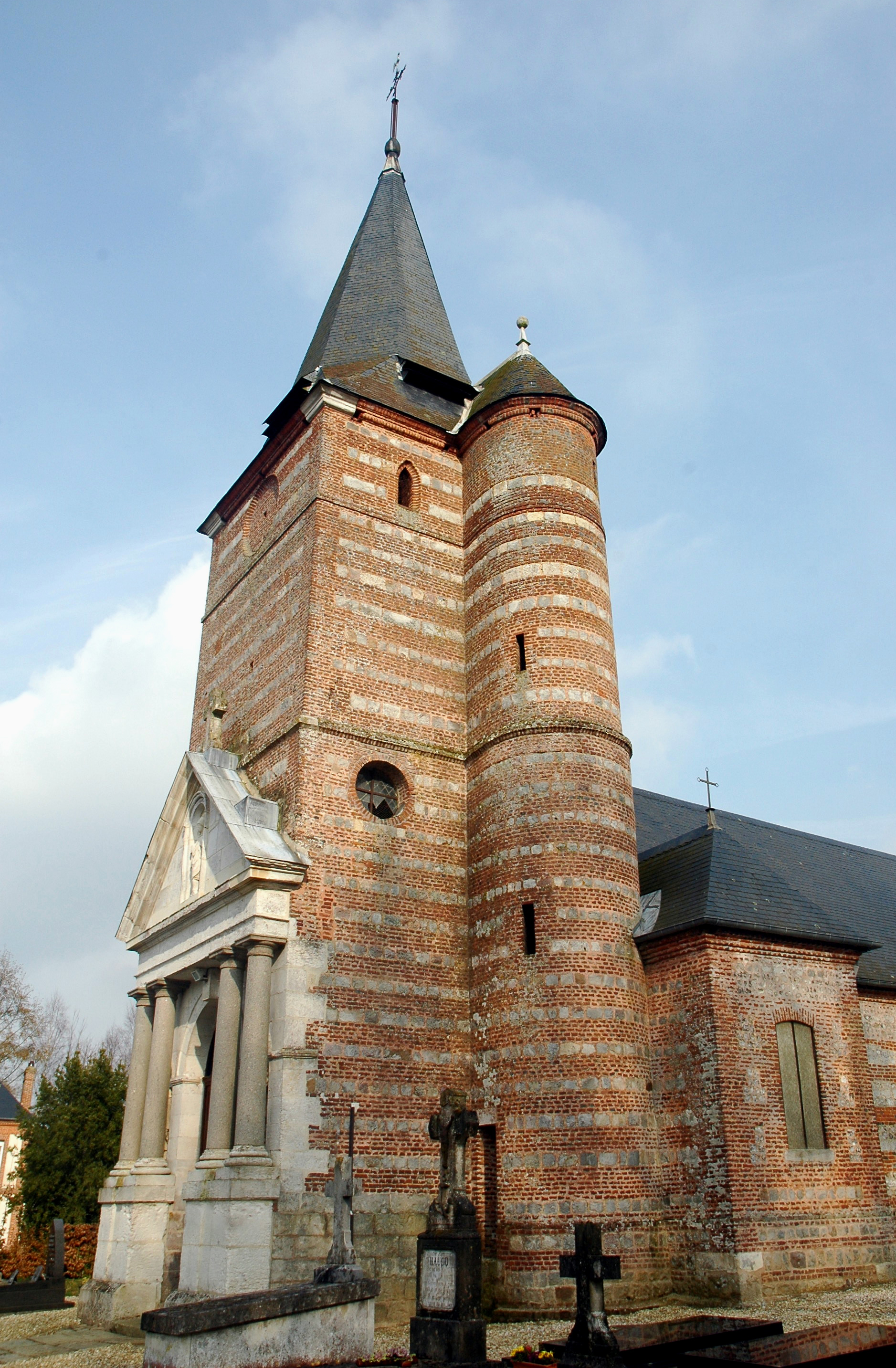
- The church in Veauville-lès-Quelles

- Coat of arms
- Location of Veauville-lès-Quelles
- Location within France Location within Normandy
- Coordinates: 49°44′24″N 0°42′24″E
- Country: France
- Region: Normandy
- Department: Seine-Maritime
- Arrondissement: Dieppe
- Canton: Saint-Valery-en-Caux
- Intercommunality: CC Côte d'Albâtre

Government
  - Mayor (2026–32): Pascal Paul
- Area^{1}: 3.21 km^{2} (1.24 sq mi)
- Elevation: 125 m (410 ft)
- Highest elevation: 145 m (476 ft)
- Lowest elevation: 75 m (246 ft)
- Population (2023): 124
  - Density: 38.6/km^{2} (100/sq mi)
- Time zone: UTC+01:00 (CET)
  - Summer (DST): UTC+02:00 (CEST)
- INSEE/Postal code: 76730 /76560
- ^{1} French Land Register data, which excludes lakes, ponds, glaciers > 1 km^{2} (0.386 sq mi or 247 acres) and river estuaries.

Veauville-lès-Quelles (French pronunciation: [vovil lɛ kɛl]) is a commune in the Seine-Maritime department in the Normandy region in northern France.

== Geography ==
A very small farming village in the Pays de Caux, situated some 33 miles (53 km) northeast of Le Havre, at the junction of the D88 and D109 roads.

== Population ==
Historical population
Year	Pop.	±% p.a.
1968	148	—
1975	99	−5.58%
1982	98	−0.14%
1990	86	−1.62%
1999	102	+1.91%
2007	104	+0.24%
2012	113	+1.67%
2017	130	+2.84%
2023	124	−0.78%
Source: INSEE

== Places of interest ==
- The church of Notre-Dame, dating from the nineteenth century.
- The chateau de Mathonville.

== See also ==
- Communes of the Seine-Maritime department
