= Canton of Saint-Valery-en-Caux =

Coordinates: 49°50′04″N 0°44′14″E

Saint-Valery-en-Caux
- Canton
- Country: France
- Region: Normandy
- Department: Seine-Maritime
- No. of communes: {{{nbcomm}}}
- Area: 475.02 km^{2} (183.41 sq mi)
- Population (2023): 35,292
  - Density: 74.296/km^{2} (192.43/sq mi)
- INSEE code: 76 33

The Canton of Saint-Valery-en-Caux is a canton situated in the Seine-Maritime département and in the Normandy region of northern France.

== Geography ==
An area of fishing, farming and associated light industry, centred on the port of Saint-Valery-en-Caux.

== Composition ==
At the French canton reorganisation which came into effect in March 2015, the canton was expanded from 14 to 77 communes (7 of which merged into the new commune Terres-de-Caux):

- Alvimare
- Ancourteville-sur-Héricourt
- Angiens
- Anglesqueville-la-Bras-Long
- Auberville-la-Manuel
- Autigny
- Bertheauville
- Bertreville
- Beuzeville-la-Guérard
- Blosseville
- Bosville
- Le Bourg-Dun
- Bourville
- Brametot
- Butot-Vénesville
- Cailleville
- Canouville
- Cany-Barville
- La Chapelle-sur-Dun
- Clasville
- Cleuville
- Cléville
- Cliponville
- Crasville-la-Mallet
- Crasville-la-Rocquefort
- Drosay
- Envronville
- Ermenouville
- Fontaine-le-Dun
- Foucart
- La Gaillarde
- Grainville-la-Teinturière
- Gueutteville-les-Grès
- Le Hanouard
- Hattenville
- Hautot-l'Auvray
- Héberville
- Houdetot
- Ingouville
- Malleville-les-Grès
- Manneville-ès-Plains
- Le Mesnil-Durdent
- Néville
- Normanville
- Ocqueville
- Oherville
- Ouainville
- Ourville-en-Caux
- Paluel
- Pleine-Sève
- Rocquefort
- Saint-Aubin-sur-Mer
- Sainte-Colombe
- Saint-Martin-aux-Buneaux
- Saint-Pierre-le-Vieux
- Saint-Pierre-le-Viger
- Saint-Riquier-ès-Plains
- Saint-Sylvain
- Saint-Vaast-Dieppedalle
- Saint-Valery-en-Caux
- Sasseville
- Sommesnil
- Sotteville-sur-Mer
- Terres-de-Caux
- Thiouville
- Trémauville
- Veauville-lès-Quelles
- Veules-les-Roses
- Veulettes-sur-Mer
- Vittefleur
- Yébleron

== Population ==
Historical population
Year	Pop.	±% p.a.
2013	35,637	—
2018	35,750	+0.06%
Source: INSEE

== See also ==
- Arrondissements of the Seine-Maritime department
- Cantons of the Seine-Maritime department
- Communes of the Seine-Maritime department
