= Le Mesnil-Durdent =

- Commune
- Coat of arms
- Location of Le Mesnil-Durdent
- Location within France Location within Normandy
- Coordinates: 49°49′01″N 0°46′24″E
- Country: France
- Region: Normandy
- Department: Seine-Maritime
- Arrondissement: Dieppe
- Canton: Saint-Valery-en-Caux
- Intercommunality: CC Côte d'Albâtre

Government
  - Mayor (2026–32): Bertrand Carpentier
- Area^{1}: 1.32 km^{2} (0.51 sq mi)
- Elevation: 100 m (330 ft)
- Highest elevation: 92 m (302 ft)
- Lowest elevation: 69 m (226 ft)
- Population (2023): 18
  - Density: 14/km^{2} (35/sq mi)
- Time zone: UTC+01:00 (CET)
  - Summer (DST): UTC+02:00 (CEST)
- INSEE/Postal code: 76428 /76460
- ^{1} French Land Register data, which excludes lakes, ponds, glaciers > 1 km^{2} (0.386 sq mi or 247 acres) and river estuaries.

Le Mesnil-Durdent is a commune in the Seine-Maritime department in the Normandy region in northern France.

== Geography ==
Le Mesnil-Durdent is farming village in the Pays de Caux, some 19 miles (31 km) southwest of Dieppe at the junction of the D70 and the D75 roads.

== Population ==
Historical population
Year	Pop.	±% p.a.
1968	34	—
1975	27	−3.24%
1982	20	−4.20%
1990	20	+0.00%
1999	27	+3.39%
2007	23	−1.98%
2012	21	−1.80%
2017	18	−3.04%
2023	18	+0.00%
Source: INSEE

== Places of interest ==
- The church of St. Aubin, dating from the eighteenth century.
- The Jardin des Amouhoques.

== See also ==
- Communes of the Seine-Maritime department
