= Cleuville =

- Commune
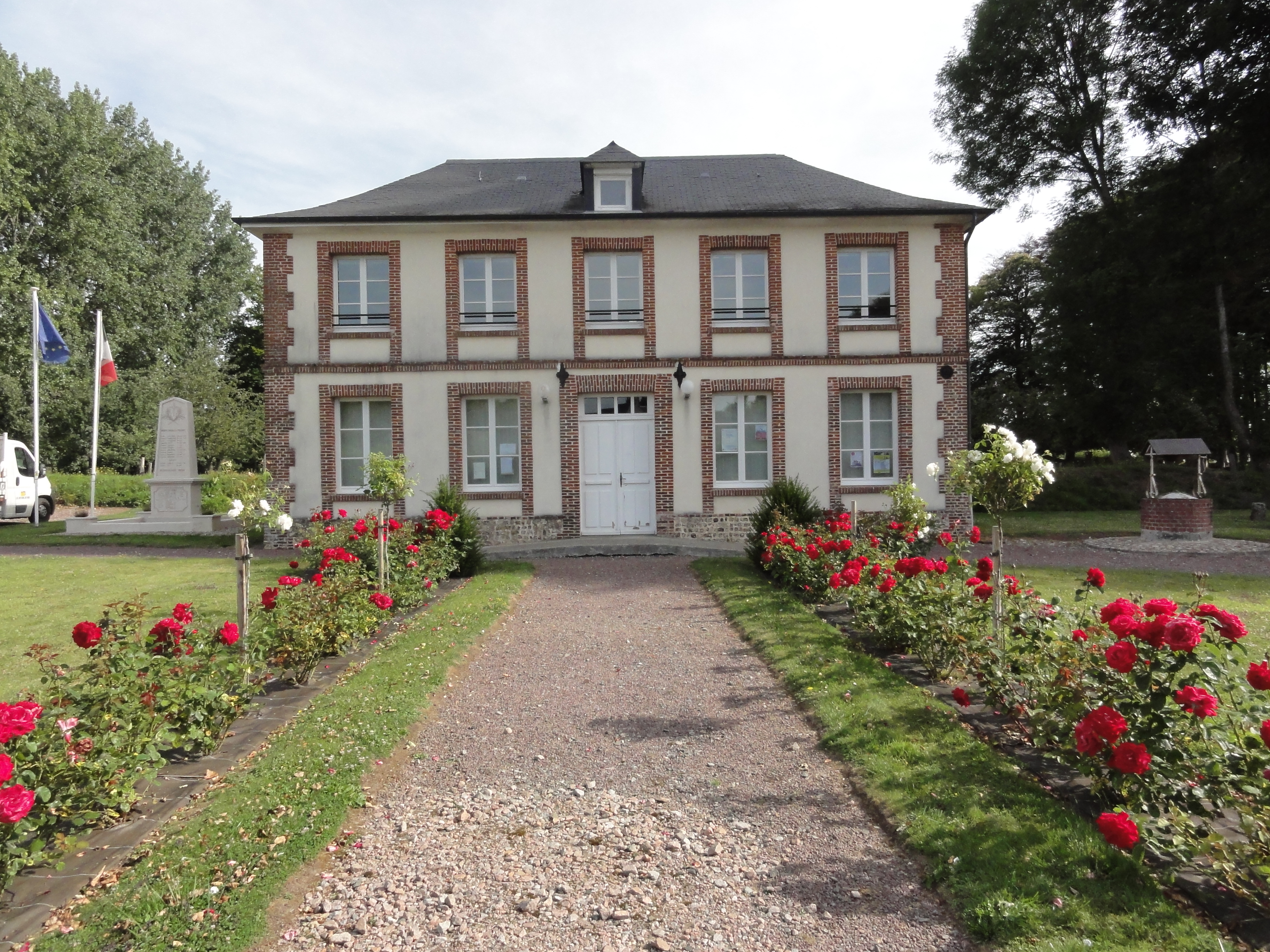
- Cleuville Town hall
- Location of Cleuville
- Location within France Location within Normandy
- Coordinates: 49°42′39″N 0°38′00″E
- Country: France
- Region: Normandy
- Department: Seine-Maritime
- Arrondissement: Dieppe
- Canton: Saint-Valery-en-Caux
- Intercommunality: CC Côte d'Albâtre

Government
  - Mayor (2026–32): Laurent Appercelle
- Area^{1}: 4.1 km^{2} (1.6 sq mi)
- Elevation: 145 m (476 ft)
- Highest elevation: 142 m (466 ft)
- Lowest elevation: 85 m (279 ft)
- Population (2023): 190
  - Density: 46/km^{2} (120/sq mi)
- Time zone: UTC+01:00 (CET)
  - Summer (DST): UTC+02:00 (CEST)
- INSEE/Postal code: 76180 /76450
- ^{1} French Land Register data, which excludes lakes, ponds, glaciers > 1 km^{2} (0.386 sq mi or 247 acres) and river estuaries.

Cleuville (French pronunciation: [kløvil]) is a commune in the Seine-Maritime department in the Normandy region in northern France.

== Geography ==
A small farming village situated in the Pays de Caux, some 24 miles (39 km) northeast of Le Havre, at the junction of the D109 and D306 roads.

== Population ==
Historical population
Year	Pop.	±% p.a.
1968	148	—
1975	120	−2.95%
1982	112	−0.98%
1990	111	−0.11%
1999	119	+0.78%
2007	151	+3.02%
2012	185	+4.15%
2017	194	+0.95%
2023	190	−0.35%
Source: INSEE

== Places of interest ==
- The vestiges of a motte and donjon.
- The church of St.Leger, dating from the twelfth century.

== See also ==
- Communes of the Seine-Maritime department
