= Bertreville =

- Commune
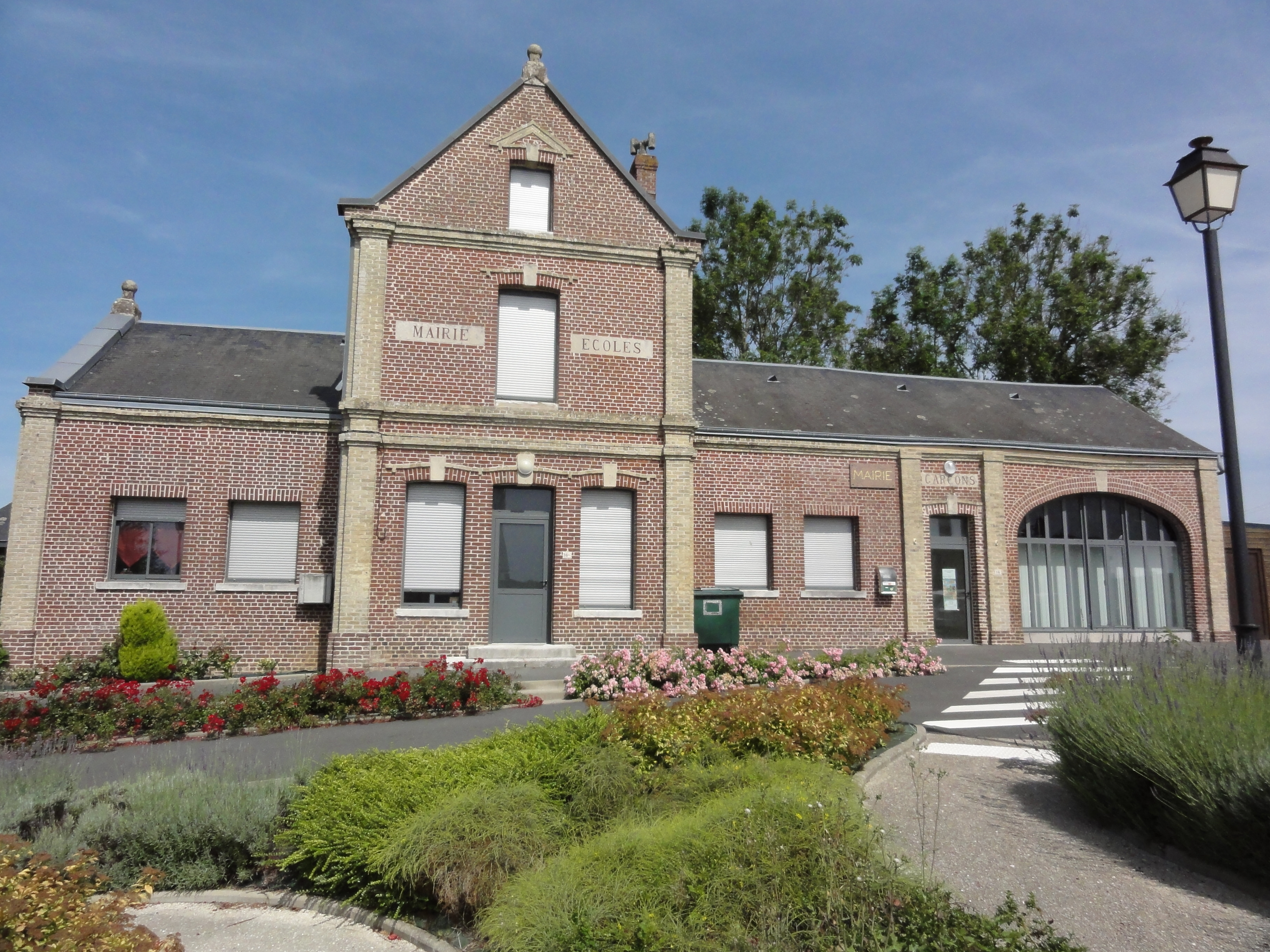
- Bertreville Town hall

- Coat of arms
- Location of Bertreville
- Location within France Location within Normandy
- Coordinates: 49°46′07″N 0°34′52″E
- Country: France
- Region: Normandy
- Department: Seine-Maritime
- Arrondissement: Dieppe
- Canton: Saint-Valery-en-Caux
- Intercommunality: CC Côte d'Albâtre

Government
  - Mayor (2026–32): Sophie Douville
- Area^{1}: 3.22 km^{2} (1.24 sq mi)
- Elevation: 100 m (330 ft)
- Highest elevation: 119 m (390 ft)
- Lowest elevation: 99 m (325 ft)
- Population (2023): 121
  - Density: 37.6/km^{2} (97.3/sq mi)
- Time zone: UTC+01:00 (CET)
  - Summer (DST): UTC+02:00 (CEST)
- INSEE/Postal code: 76084 /76450
- ^{1} French Land Register data, which excludes lakes, ponds, glaciers > 1 km^{2} (0.386 sq mi or 247 acres) and river estuaries.

Bertreville (French pronunciation: [bɛʁtʁəvil]) is a commune in the Seine-Maritime department in the Normandy region in northern France.

== Geography ==
A very small farming village in the Pays de Caux, situated some 26 miles (42 km) southwest of Dieppe, on the D210 road.

== Population ==
Historical population
| Year | Pop. | ±% p.a. |
|---|---|---|
| 1968 | 78 | — |
| 1975 | 57 | −4.38% |
| 1982 | 73 | +3.60% |
| 1990 | 98 | +3.75% |
| 1999 | 95 | −0.34% |
| 2007 | 100 | +0.64% |
| 2012 | 111 | +2.11% |
| 2017 | 120 | +1.57% |
| 2023 | 121 | +0.14% |
Source: INSEE

== Places of interest ==
- The church, built in the 16th century.

== See also ==
- Communes of the Seine-Maritime department
