= Canouville =

- Commune
- Coat of arms
- Location of Canouville
- Location within France Location within Normandy
- Coordinates: 49°48′24″N 0°36′06″E
- Country: France
- Region: Normandy
- Department: Seine-Maritime
- Arrondissement: Dieppe
- Canton: Saint-Valery-en-Caux
- Intercommunality: CC Côte d'Albâtre

Government
  - Mayor (2026–32): Annie Dumenil
- Area^{1}: 4.49 km^{2} (1.73 sq mi)
- Elevation: 104 m (341 ft)
- Highest elevation: 106 m (348 ft)
- Lowest elevation: 27 m (89 ft)
- Population (2023): 344
  - Density: 76.6/km^{2} (198/sq mi)
- Time zone: UTC+01:00 (CET)
  - Summer (DST): UTC+02:00 (CEST)
- INSEE/Postal code: 76156 /76450
- ^{1} French Land Register data, which excludes lakes, ponds, glaciers > 1 km^{2} (0.386 sq mi or 247 acres) and river estuaries.

Canouville (French pronunciation: [kanuvil]) is a commune in the Seine-Maritime department in the Normandy region in northern France.

== Geography ==
A farming village situated in the Pays de Caux, some 42 kilometres (26 mi) southwest of Dieppe, at the junction of the D271, D71 and the D69 roads.

== Population ==
Historical population
| Year | Pop. | ±% p.a. |
|---|---|---|
| 1968 | 201 | — |
| 1975 | 149 | −4.19% |
| 1982 | 184 | +3.06% |
| 1990 | 236 | +3.16% |
| 1999 | 245 | +0.42% |
| 2007 | 285 | +1.91% |
| 2012 | 324 | +2.60% |
| 2017 | 335 | +0.67% |
| 2023 | 344 | +0.44% |
Source: INSEE

== Places of interest ==
- The church of Notre-Dame, dating from the thirteenth century.
- A chateau.

== See also ==
- Communes of the Seine-Maritime department
