= Hautot-l'Auvray =

Hautot-l’Auvray
- Commune
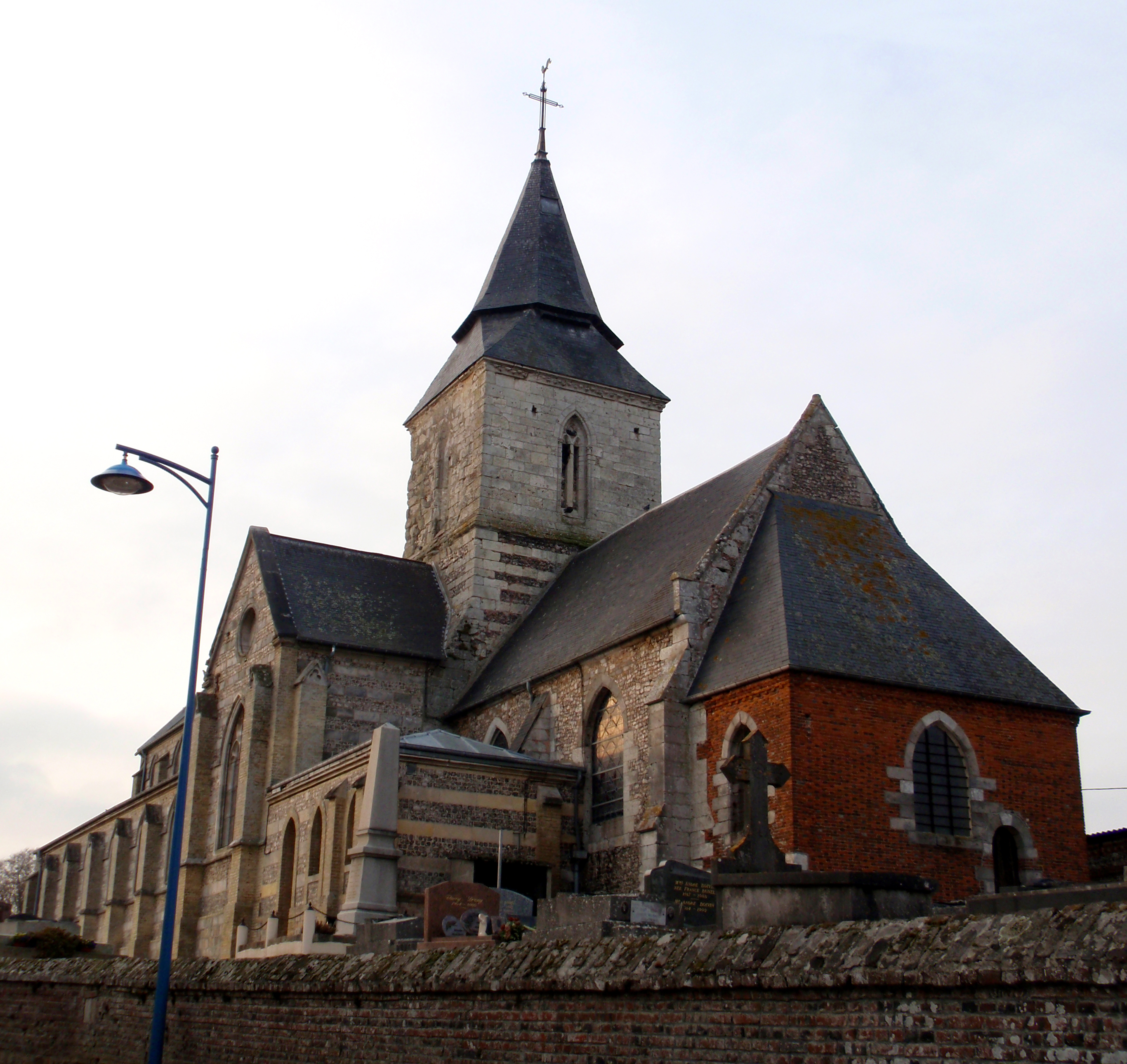
- The church in Hautot-l'Auvray

- Coat of arms
- Location of Hautot-l’Auvray
- Location within France Location within Normandy
- Coordinates: 49°45′42″N 0°45′07″E
- Country: France
- Region: Normandy
- Department: Seine-Maritime
- Arrondissement: Dieppe
- Canton: Saint-Valery-en-Caux
- Intercommunality: CC Côte d'Albâtre

Government
  - Mayor (2026–32): Didier Peulvey
- Area^{1}: 7.33 km^{2} (2.83 sq mi)
- Elevation: 100 m (330 ft)
- Highest elevation: 135 m (443 ft)
- Lowest elevation: 77 m (253 ft)
- Population (2023): 305
  - Density: 41.6/km^{2} (108/sq mi)
- Time zone: UTC+01:00 (CET)
  - Summer (DST): UTC+02:00 (CEST)
- INSEE/Postal code: 76346 /76450
- ^{1} French Land Register data, which excludes lakes, ponds, glaciers > 1 km^{2} (0.386 sq mi or 247 acres) and river estuaries.

Hautot-l’Auvray (French pronunciation: [oto lovʁɛ]) is a commune in the Seine-Maritime department in the Normandy region in northern France.

== Geography ==
A farming village situated in the Pays de Caux, some 31 miles (50 km) northeast of Le Havre, at the junction of the D50, D250 and D109 roads.

== Population ==
Historical population
Year	Pop.	±% p.a.
1968	319	—
1975	292	−1.26%
1982	308	+0.76%
1990	309	+0.04%
1999	339	+1.03%
2007	325	−0.53%
2012	347	+1.32%
2017	329	−1.06%
2023	305	−1.25%
Source: INSEE

== Places of interest ==
- The church of St.Martin, dating from the thirteenth century.
- The fourteenth century chapel of Notre-Dame.

== See also ==
- Communes of the Seine-Maritime department
