= Saint-Martin-aux-Buneaux =

- Commune
- Coat of arms
- Location of Saint-Martin-aux-Buneaux
- Location within France Location within Normandy
- Coordinates: 49°49′33″N 0°33′13″E
- Country: France
- Region: Normandy
- Department: Seine-Maritime
- Arrondissement: Dieppe
- Canton: Saint-Valery-en-Caux
- Intercommunality: CC Côte d'Albâtre

Government
  - Mayor (2026–32): Pierre Bazin
- Area^{1}: 8.14 km^{2} (3.14 sq mi)
- Elevation: 90 m (300 ft)
- Highest elevation: 91 m (299 ft)
- Lowest elevation: 0 m (0 ft)
- Population (2023): 633
  - Density: 77.8/km^{2} (201/sq mi)
- Time zone: UTC+01:00 (CET)
  - Summer (DST): UTC+02:00 (CEST)
- INSEE/Postal code: 76613 /76450
- ^{1} French Land Register data, which excludes lakes, ponds, glaciers > 1 km^{2} (0.386 sq mi or 247 acres) and river estuaries.

Saint-Martin-aux-Buneaux (French pronunciation: [sɛ̃ maʁtɛ̃ o byno]) is a commune in the Seine-Maritime department in the Normandy region in northern France.

== Geography ==
A coastal farming village situated in the Pays de Caux, at the junction of the D68, D71 and the D79 roads, some 26 miles (42 km) southwest of Dieppe. The northern border of the commune is marked by huge chalk cliffs rising over a pebble beach and overlooking the English Channel.

== Population ==
Historical population
Year	Pop.	±% p.a.
1968	749	—
1975	680	−1.37%
1982	696	+0.33%
1990	590	−2.04%
1999	600	+0.19%
2007	660	+1.20%
2012	668	+0.24%
2017	660	−0.24%
2023	633	−0.69%
Source: INSEE

== Places of interest ==
- The church of St. Martin, dating from the sixteenth century.
- A sixteenth-century chateau.
- A stone cross from the sixteenth century.

== People ==
- Pierre Bérégovoy, French prime minister in the 1990s, lived here.

== See also ==
- Communes of the Seine-Maritime department
