= Thiouville =

- Commune
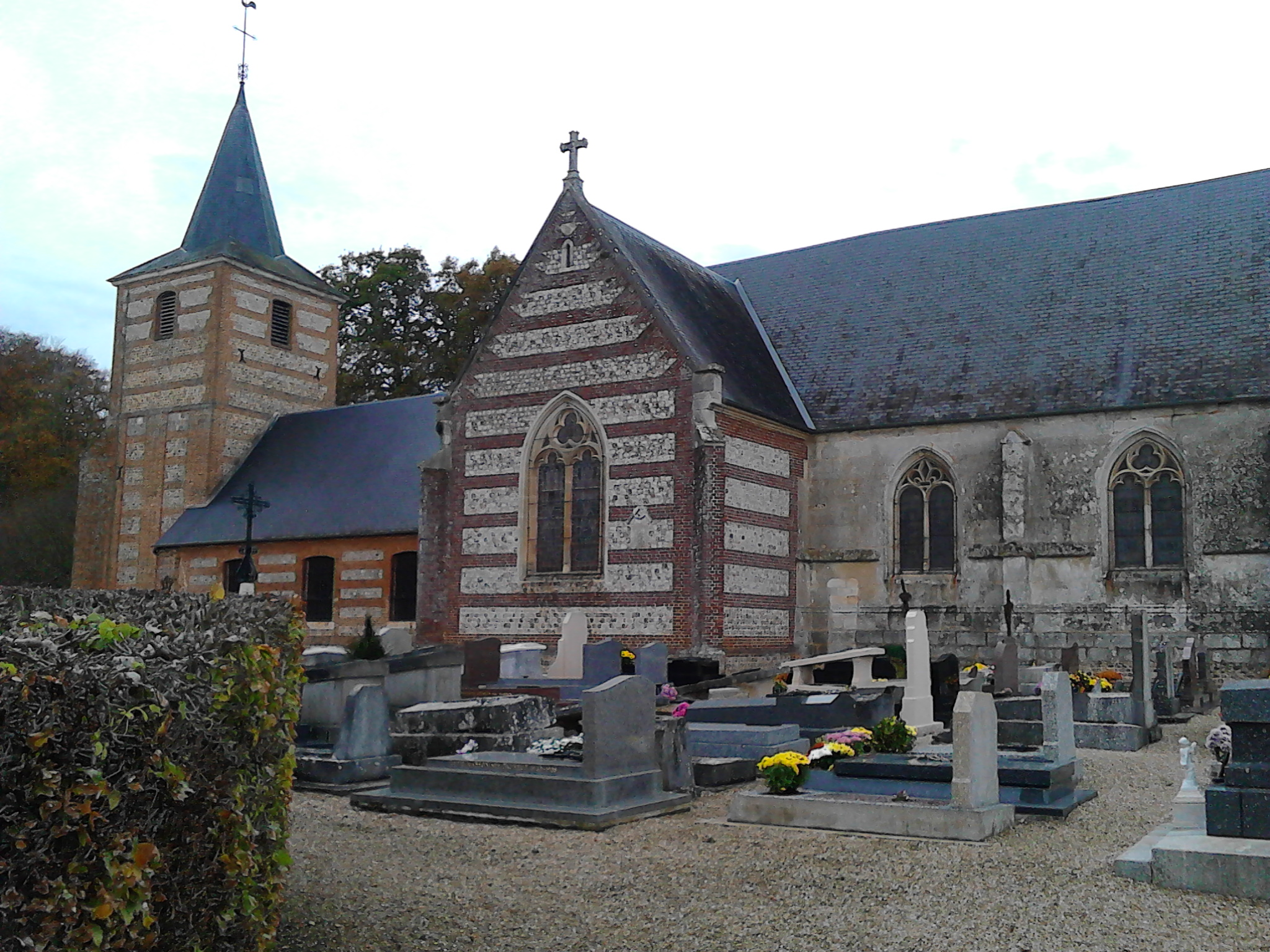
- Saint Vaast church in Thiouville

- Coat of arms
- Location of Thiouville
- Location within France Location within Normandy
- Coordinates: 49°41′40″N 0°37′11″E
- Country: France
- Region: Normandy
- Department: Seine-Maritime
- Arrondissement: Dieppe
- Canton: Saint-Valery-en-Caux
- Intercommunality: CC Côte d'Albâtre

Government
  - Mayor (2026–32): Christophe Lemettais
- Area^{1}: 5.86 km^{2} (2.26 sq mi)
- Elevation: 110 m (360 ft)
- Highest elevation: 140 m (460 ft)
- Lowest elevation: 114 m (374 ft)
- Population (2023): 275
  - Density: 46.9/km^{2} (122/sq mi)
- Time zone: UTC+01:00 (CET)
  - Summer (DST): UTC+02:00 (CEST)
- INSEE/Postal code: 76692 /76450
- ^{1} French Land Register data, which excludes lakes, ponds, glaciers > 1 km^{2} (0.386 sq mi or 247 acres) and river estuaries.

Thiouville is a commune in the Seine-Maritime department in the Normandy region in northern France.

== Geography ==
A farming village in the Pays de Caux, situated some 27 miles (43 km) northeast of Le Havre, at the junction of the D233 and D109 roads.

== Population ==
Historical population
| Year | Pop. | ±% p.a. |
|---|---|---|
| 1968 | 271 | — |
| 1975 | 257 | −0.75% |
| 1982 | 242 | −0.86% |
| 1990 | 235 | −0.37% |
| 1999 | 240 | +0.23% |
| 2007 | 291 | +2.44% |
| 2012 | 274 | −1.20% |
| 2017 | 309 | +2.43% |
| 2023 | 275 | −1.92% |
Source: INSEE

== Places of interest ==
- The church of St. Vaast, dating from the sixteenth century.
- An eighteenth-century chateau.

== See also ==
- Communes of the Seine-Maritime department
