= Cany-Barville =

- Commune
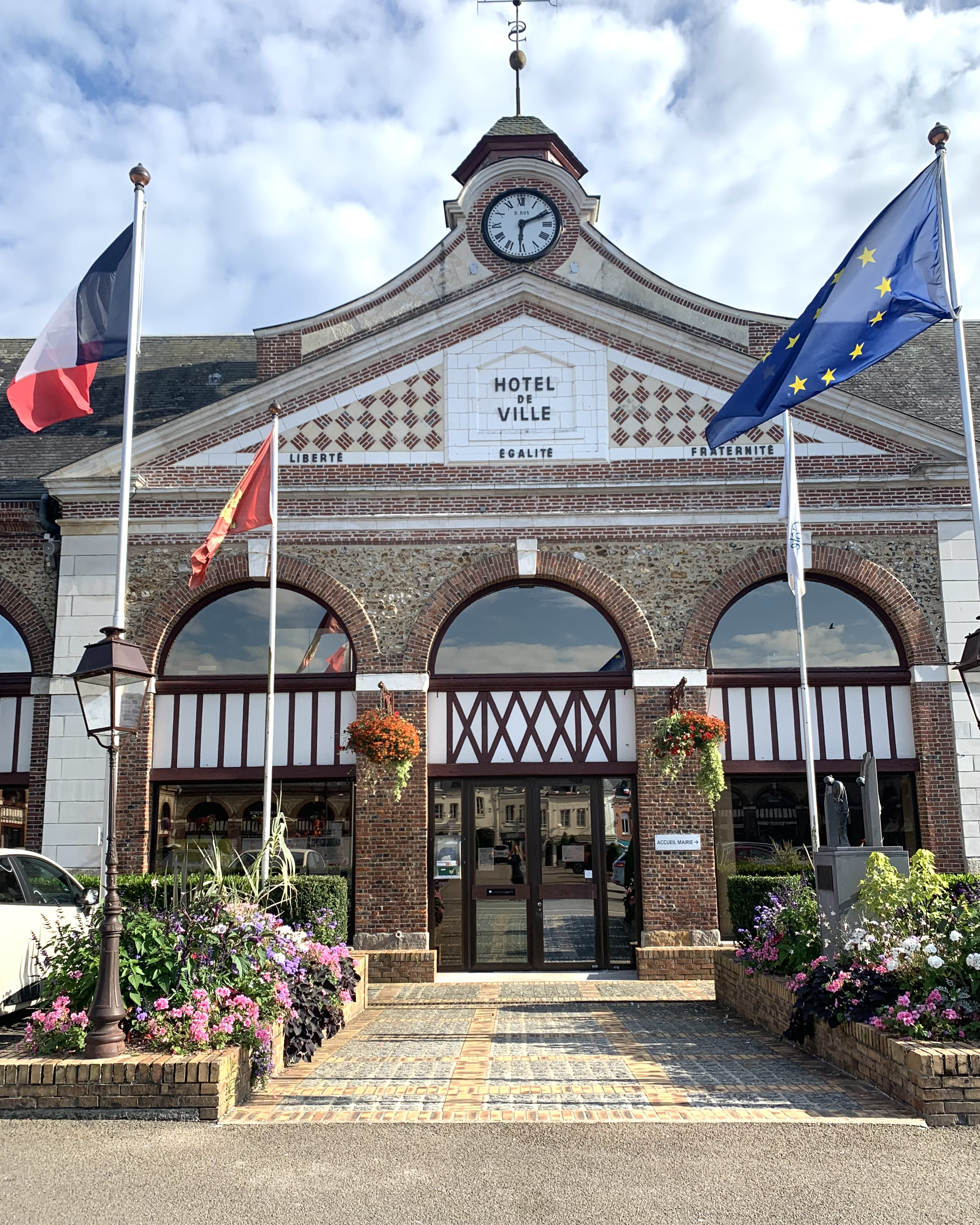
- The church in Cany-Barville

- Coat of arms
- Location of Cany-Barville
- Location within France Location within Normandy
- Coordinates: 49°47′19″N 0°38′22″E
- Country: France
- Region: Normandy
- Department: Seine-Maritime
- Arrondissement: Dieppe
- Canton: Saint-Valery-en-Caux
- Intercommunality: CC Côte d'Albâtre

Government
  - Mayor (2020–2026): Jean-Pierre Thévenot
- Area^{1}: 13.57 km^{2} (5.24 sq mi)
- Elevation: 25 m (82 ft)
- Highest elevation: 126 m (413 ft)
- Lowest elevation: 10 m (33 ft)
- Population (2023): 2,909
  - Density: 214.4/km^{2} (555.2/sq mi)
- Time zone: UTC+01:00 (CET)
  - Summer (DST): UTC+02:00 (CEST)
- INSEE/Postal code: 76159 /76450
- ^{1} French Land Register data, which excludes lakes, ponds, glaciers > 1 km^{2} (0.386 sq mi or 247 acres) and river estuaries.

Cany-Barville (French pronunciation: [kani baʁvil]) is a commune in the Seine-Maritime department in the Normandy region in northern France.

== Geography ==
A farming and light industrial town situated by the banks of the river Durdent in the Pays de Caux, some 25 miles (40 km) southwest of Dieppe, at the junction of the D925, D10 and the D268 roads.

=== Heraldry ===
Arms of Cany-Barville	The arms of Cany-Barville are blazoned : Quarterly 1: Argent, 2 garbs of wheat vert and an apple tree vert fructed gules; 2: Azure, a horse and in sinister chief a sheep argent; 3: Azure, a pike contourny and an eel contourny argent; 4: Argent, a hill filling most of the field, rising to sinister, with 5 trees at the top, vert, a fess wavy argent 'river'. [Really, quarter 4 is Vert, a fess wavy argent, and a bit of indescribable sky argent.]

== Population ==
Historical population
Year	Pop.	±% p.a.
1968	1,704	—
1975	2,209	+3.78%
1982	3,202	+5.45%
1990	3,349	+0.56%
1999	3,364	+0.05%
2007	3,097	−1.03%
2012	3,014	−0.54%
2017	3,052	+0.25%
2023	2,909	−0.80%
Source: INSEE

== Places of interest ==
- The church of St. Siméon, at Barville, dating from the 16th century
- The church of St. Martin, at Cany, dating from the 13th century
- The 17th-century chapel of St. Gilles and St. Leu
- The 17th-century château de Cany, built between 1640 and 1656 by François Mansart, with its chapel and a park
- Remains of a fortified manor house dating from the 14th century
- A feudal motte at Barville
- The 15th-century watermill and museum.

== Notable people ==
- Louis Bouilhet, French poet, was born here.

== See also ==
- Communes of the Seine-Maritime department
