= Ouainville =

- Commune
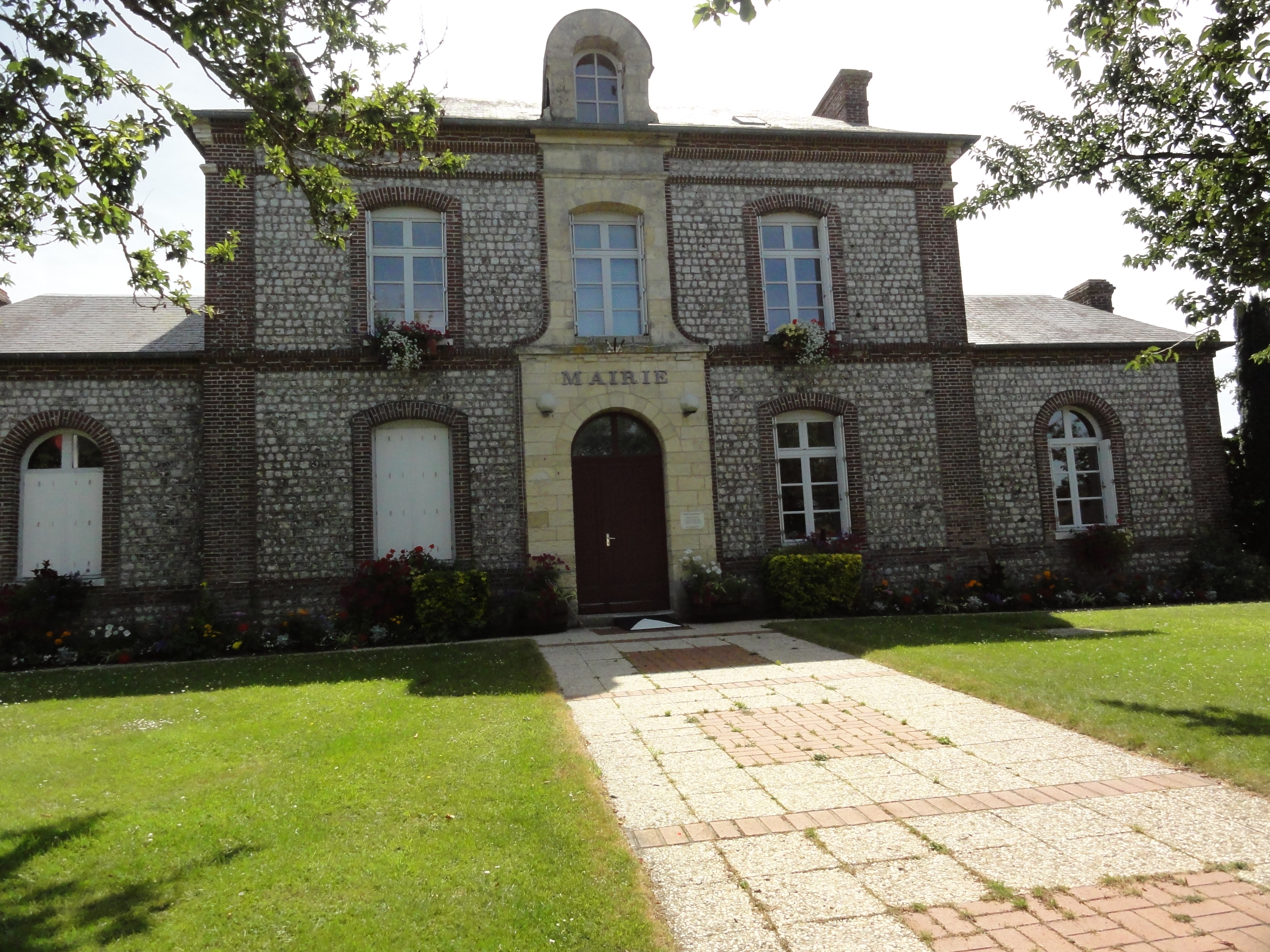
- Town hall

- Coat of arms
- Location of Ouainville
- Location within France Location within Normandy
- Coordinates: 49°47′10″N 0°35′28″E
- Country: France
- Region: Normandy
- Department: Seine-Maritime
- Arrondissement: Dieppe
- Canton: Saint-Valery-en-Caux
- Intercommunality: CC Côte d'Albâtre

Government
  - Mayor (2026–32): Bruno Thune
- Area^{1}: 7.01 km^{2} (2.71 sq mi)
- Elevation: 109 m (358 ft)
- Highest elevation: 116 m (381 ft)
- Lowest elevation: 71 m (233 ft)
- Population (2023): 540
  - Density: 77/km^{2} (200/sq mi)
- Time zone: UTC+01:00 (CET)
  - Summer (DST): UTC+02:00 (CEST)
- INSEE/Postal code: 76488 /76450
- ^{1} French Land Register data, which excludes lakes, ponds, glaciers > 1 km^{2} (0.386 sq mi or 247 acres) and river estuaries.

Ouainville (French pronunciation: [wɛ̃vil]) is a commune in the Seine-Maritime department in the Normandy region in northern France.

== Geography ==
A farming village situated in the Pays de Caux at the junction of the D471 and the D71 roads, some 29 miles (47 km) southwest of Dieppe.

== Population ==
Historical population
Year	Pop.	±% p.a.
1968	268	—
1975	270	+0.11%
1982	420	+6.52%
1990	450	+0.87%
1999	485	+0.84%
2007	508	+0.58%
2012	503	−0.20%
2017	527	+0.94%
2023	540	+0.41%
Source: INSEE

== Places of interest ==
- The church of St.Maclou, dating from the eighteenth century.
- A sixteenth-century stone cross.

== See also ==
- Communes of the Seine-Maritime department
