= Héricourt-en-Caux =

- Commune
- Coat of arms
- Location of Héricourt-en-Caux
- Location within France Location within Normandy
- Coordinates: 49°41′52″N 0°41′56″E
- Country: France
- Region: Normandy
- Department: Seine-Maritime
- Arrondissement: Rouen
- Canton: Yvetot
- Intercommunality: CC Plateau de Caux

Government
  - Mayor (2020–2026): Emmanuel Cauchy
- Area^{1}: 10.81 km^{2} (4.17 sq mi)
- Elevation: 60 m (200 ft)
- Highest elevation: 141 m (463 ft)
- Lowest elevation: 53 m (174 ft)
- Population (2023): 941
  - Density: 87.0/km^{2} (225/sq mi)
- Time zone: UTC+01:00 (CET)
  - Summer (DST): UTC+02:00 (CEST)
- INSEE/Postal code: 76355 /76560
- ^{1} French Land Register data, which excludes lakes, ponds, glaciers > 1 km^{2} (0.386 sq mi or 247 acres) and river estuaries.

Héricourt-en-Caux (French pronunciation: [eʁikuʁ ɑ̃ ko], lit. 'Héricourt in Caux') is a commune in the Seine-Maritime department in the Normandy region in northern France.

== Geography ==
A forestry and farming village by the banks of the river Durdent, in the Pays de Caux, some 33 miles (53 km) northeast of Le Havre, at the junction of the D131, D233 and D149 roads.

== Population ==
Historical population
Year	Pop.	±% p.a.
1968	425	—
1975	515	+2.78%
1982	681	+4.07%
1990	730	+0.87%
1999	867	+1.93%
2007	934	+0.93%
2012	945	+0.23%
2017	955	+0.21%
2023	941	−0.25%
Source: INSEE

== Places of interest ==
- The church of St. Denis, dating from the nineteenth century.
- Three chapels.
- A sixteenth-century stone cross.
- A watermill.
- The chateau de Boscol, dating from the sixteenth century.
- The motte of an old castle.

== See also ==
- Communes of the Seine-Maritime department
