= Communauté de communes Entre Mer et Lin =

Coordinates: 49.814°N 0.8494°E

Entre Mer et Lin
- Former communauté de communes
- Interactive map of Entre Mer et Lin
- Country: France
- Region: Normandy
- Department: Seine-Maritime
- No. of communes: {{{nbcomm}}}
- Established: 2001
- Disbanded: 2017
- Population (1999): 5,328

The Communauté de communes Entre Mer et Lin was located in the Seine-Maritime département of the Normandy region of northern France. It was created in December 2001. It was merged into the Communauté de communes de la Côte d'Albâtre in January 2017.

== Participants ==
The Communauté de communes comprised the following 17 communes:

- Angiens
- Anglesqueville-la-Bras-Long
- Autigny
- Le Bourg-Dun
- Bourville
- Brametot
- La Chapelle-sur-Dun
- Crasville-la-Rocquefort
- Ermenouville
- Fontaine-le-Dun
- La Gaillarde
- Héberville
- Houdetot
- Saint-Aubin-sur-Mer
- Saint-Pierre-le-Vieux
- Saint-Pierre-le-Viger
- Sotteville-sur-Mer

== See also ==
- Communes of the Seine-Maritime department
