= Canton of Fontaine-le-Dun =

Coordinates: 49°49′16″N 0°50′09″E

Fontaine-le-Dun
- Former canton
- Interactive map of Fontaine-le-Dun
- Country: France
- Region: Normandy
- Department: Seine-Maritime
- No. of communes: {{{nbcomm}}}
- Disbanded: 2015
- Area: 87.36 km^{2} (33.73 sq mi)
- Population (2012): 4,497
  - Density: 51.48/km^{2} (133.3/sq mi)

The Canton of Fontaine-le-Dun is a former canton situated in the Seine-Maritime département and in the Haute-Normandie region of northern France. It was disbanded following the French canton reorganisation which came into effect in March 2015. It consisted of 16 communes, which joined the canton of Saint-Valery-en-Caux in 2015. It had a total of 4,497 inhabitants (2012).

== Geography ==
A farming area in the arrondissement of Dieppe, centred on the town of Fontaine-le-Dun. The altitude varies from 0m (Saint-Aubin-sur-Mer) to 128m (Anglesqueville-la-Bras-Long) for an average altitude of 68m.

The canton comprised 16 communes:

- Angiens
- Anglesqueville-la-Bras-Long
- Autigny
- Bourville
- Brametot
- La Chapelle-sur-Dun
- Crasville-la-Rocquefort
- Ermenouville
- Fontaine-le-Dun
- La Gaillarde
- Héberville
- Houdetot
- Saint-Aubin-sur-Mer
- Saint-Pierre-le-Vieux
- Saint-Pierre-le-Viger
- Sotteville-sur-Mer

== Population ==
Historical population Canton of Fontaine-le-Dun
| Year | 1962 | 1968 | 1975 | 1982 | 1990 | 1999 |
| Pop. | 4,327 | 4,868 | 4,547 | 4,556 | 4,753 | 4,888 |
| ±% | — | +12.5% | −6.6% | +0.2% | +4.3% | +2.8% |
From the year 1962 on: No double counting – residents of multiple communes (e.g. students and military personnel) are counted only once. Source: INSEE

== See also ==
- Arrondissements of the Seine-Maritime department
- Cantons of the Seine-Maritime department
- Communes of the Seine-Maritime department
