= Communauté de communes Caux - Austreberthe =

Community in Normandy, France

Communauté de communes Caux
- Community
- Interactive map of Communauté de communes Caux
- Coordinates: 49°33′31.09″N 0°56′24.44″E
- Country: France
- Region: Normandy
- Department: Seine-Maritime
- Established: December 28, 2001

Population (2022)
  - Total: 25,137
  - Density: 284/km^{2} (740/sq mi)

Communauté de communes Caux (English: Community of Communes Caux-Austreberthe) is a large community located within the Seine-Maritime, inside of Normandy.

== History ==
The inter-municipal association was created by a prefectural decree of December 21, 2001 which took effect on January 1, 2002. In accordance with the requirements of the departmental plan for inter-municipal cooperation (SDCI) approved by the prefect in 2016, on January 1, 2017, the community of communes integrated two communes previously belonging to the Plateau Vert community of communes: Blacqueville and Bouville.

== Geography ==
Located in the west of the Seine-Maritime department, the Caux-Austreberthe community of communes includes 9 communes and covers 88.5 square kilometres (34.2 sq mi).
