= Autigny =

Autigny may refer to the following places:

- Autigny, Switzerland, a commune in the canton of Fribourg, Switzerland
- Autigny, Seine-Maritime, a commune in the Seine-Maritime department, France
