= Saint-Aubin-sur-Mer =

Saint-Aubin-sur-Mer is the name of two communes in France:

- Saint-Aubin-sur-Mer, Calvados, in the Calvados département
- Saint-Aubin-sur-Mer, Seine-Maritime, in the Seine-Maritime département
