= Argueil =

- Commune
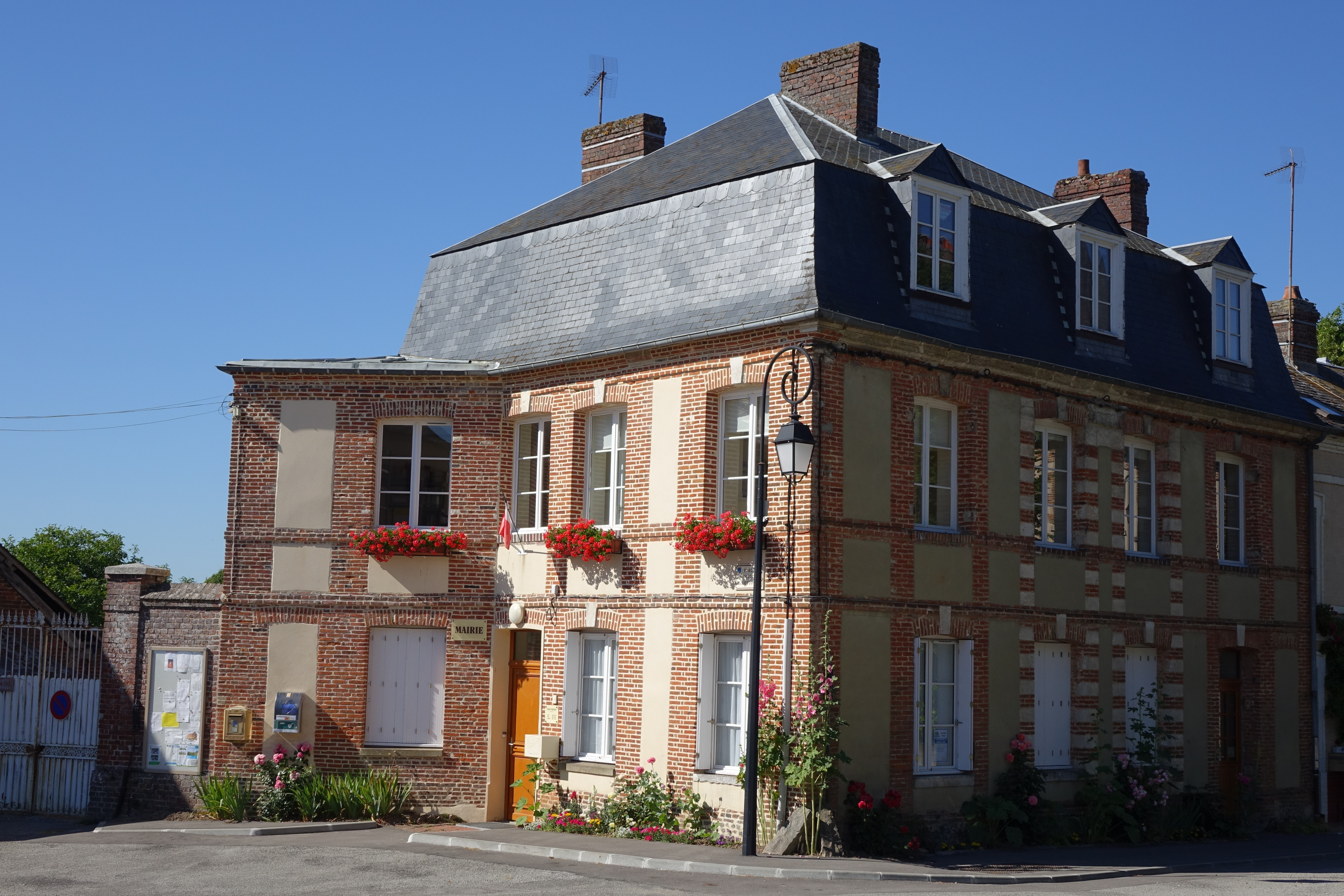
- The town hall in Argueil

- Coat of arms
- Location of Argueil
- Location within France Location within Normandy
- Coordinates: 49°32′30″N 1°30′57″E
- Country: France
- Region: Normandy
- Department: Seine-Maritime
- Arrondissement: Dieppe
- Canton: Gournay-en-Bray
- Intercommunality: CC Quatre Rivières

Government
  - Mayor (2026–32): Isabelle Bréquigny
- Area^{1}: 6.95 km^{2} (2.68 sq mi)
- Elevation: 113 m (371 ft)
- Highest elevation: 210 m (690 ft)
- Lowest elevation: 100 m (330 ft)
- Population (2023): 349
  - Density: 50.2/km^{2} (130/sq mi)
- Time zone: UTC+01:00 (CET)
  - Summer (DST): UTC+02:00 (CEST)
- INSEE/Postal code: 76025 /76780
- ^{1} French Land Register data, which excludes lakes, ponds, glaciers > 1 km^{2} (0.386 sq mi or 247 acres) and river estuaries.

Argueil (French pronunciation: [aʁɡœj]) is a commune in the Seine-Maritime department in the Normandy region in northern France.

== Geography ==
A farming village in the Pays de Bray, situated some 25 miles (40 km) northeast of Rouen, at the junction of the D921 and D41 roads. It is the smallest chef-lieu of any canton in the department.

== Heraldry ==
Arms of Argueil	The arms of Argueil are blazoned : Azure, a cross couped argent between, in chief 3 fleurs de lys and in base a mont of 3 peaks Or.

== Population ==
Historical population
Year	Pop.	±% p.a.
1968	389	—
1975	374	−0.56%
1982	395	+0.78%
1990	379	−0.52%
1999	366	−0.39%
2007	341	−0.88%
2012	335	−0.35%
2017	341	+0.36%
2023	349	+0.39%
Source: INSEE

== Places of interest ==
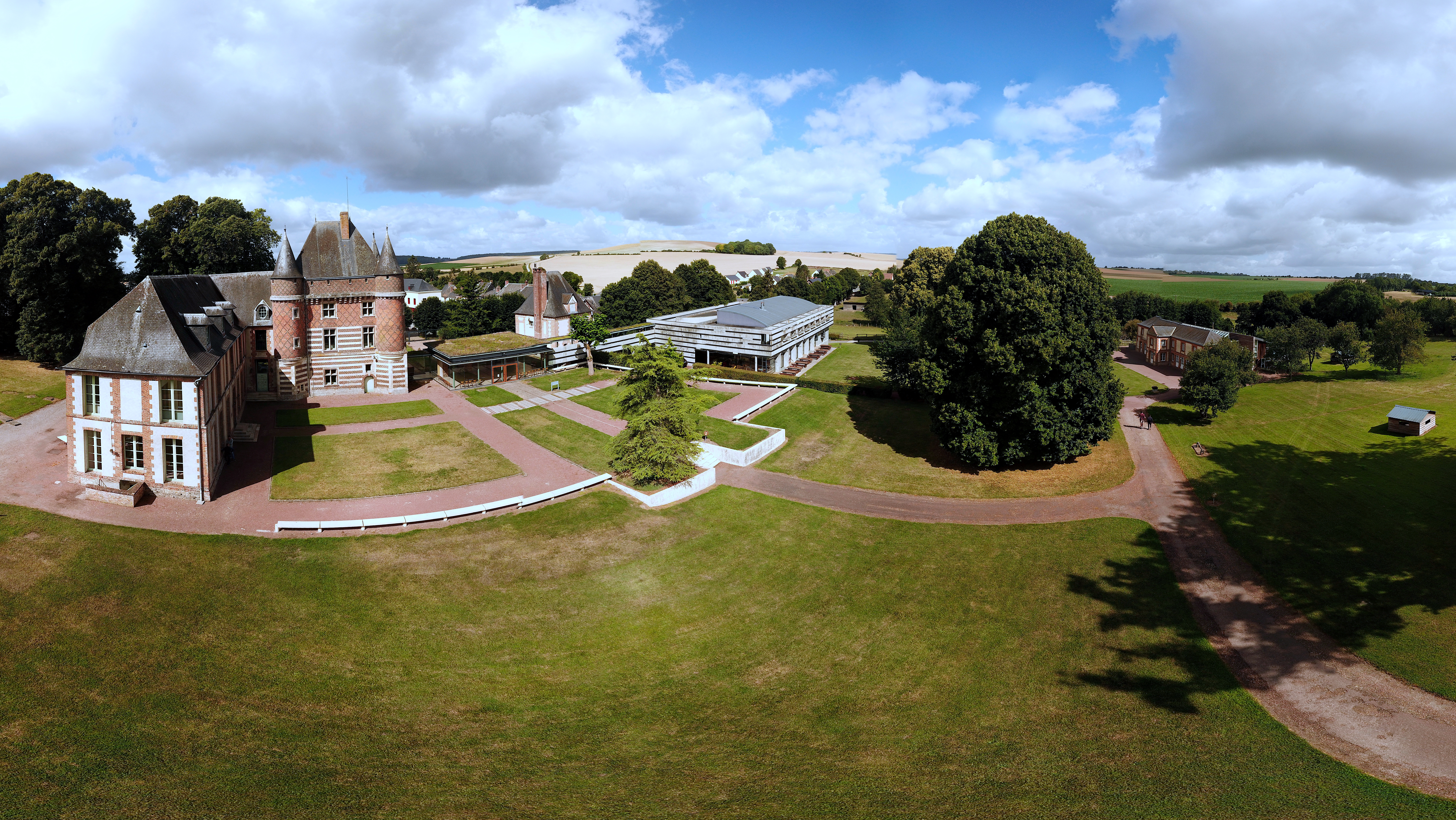
The Manoir d'Argueil

- The church of St.Maurice, dating from the sixteenth century.
- The manoir d'Argueil, dating from the sixteenth century
- Some old houses and the remains of a donjon in the park of the chateau.

== See also ==
- Communes of the Seine-Maritime department
