= Rocquefort =

- Commune
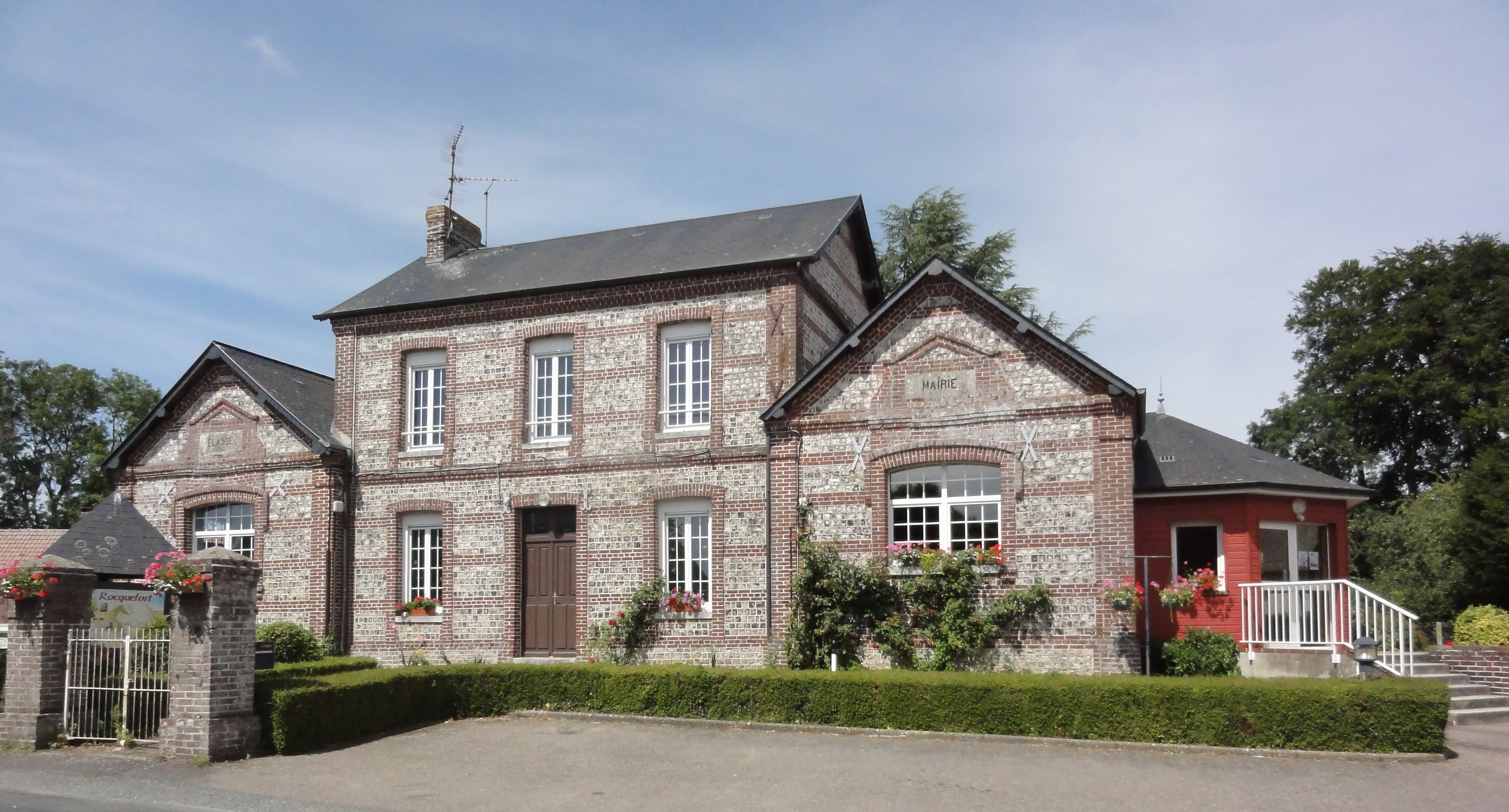
- Rocquefort Town hall

- Coat of arms
- Location of Rocquefort
- Location within France Location within Normandy
- Coordinates: 49°40′00″N 0°41′50″E
- Country: France
- Region: Normandy
- Department: Seine-Maritime
- Arrondissement: Rouen
- Canton: Saint-Valery-en-Caux
- Intercommunality: CC Yvetot Normandie

Government
  - Mayor (2026–32): Pascal Leborgne
- Area^{1}: 5.36 km^{2} (2.07 sq mi)
- Elevation: 130 m (430 ft)
- Highest elevation: 146 m (479 ft)
- Lowest elevation: 76 m (249 ft)
- Population (2023): 318
  - Density: 59.3/km^{2} (154/sq mi)
- Time zone: UTC+01:00 (CET)
  - Summer (DST): UTC+02:00 (CEST)
- INSEE/Postal code: 76531 /76640
- ^{1} French Land Register data, which excludes lakes, ponds, glaciers > 1 km^{2} (0.386 sq mi or 247 acres) and river estuaries.

Rocquefort (French pronunciation: [ʁɔkfɔʁ]) is a commune in the Seine-Maritime department in the Normandy region in northern France.

== Geography ==
A farming village in the Pays de Caux, situated some 35 miles (56 km) northeast of Le Havre, between the D29 and D131 roads, by the banks of the river Durdent.

== Heraldry ==
Arms of Rocquefort	The arms of Rocquefort are blazoned : Or, 2 hammers and a lion gules, and on a chief indented azure, a comet argent.

== Population ==
Historical population
Year	Pop.	±% p.a.
1968	240	—
1975	209	−1.96%
1982	227	+1.19%
1990	250	+1.21%
1999	270	+0.86%
2007	316	+1.99%
2012	320	+0.25%
2017	315	−0.31%
2023	318	+0.16%
Source: INSEE

== Places of interest ==
- The church of Notre-Dame, dating from the nineteenth century.
- A nineteenth-century chapel.
- An eighteenth-century chateau.
- A feudal motte.

== See also ==
- Communes of the Seine-Maritime department
