= Sasseville =

- Commune
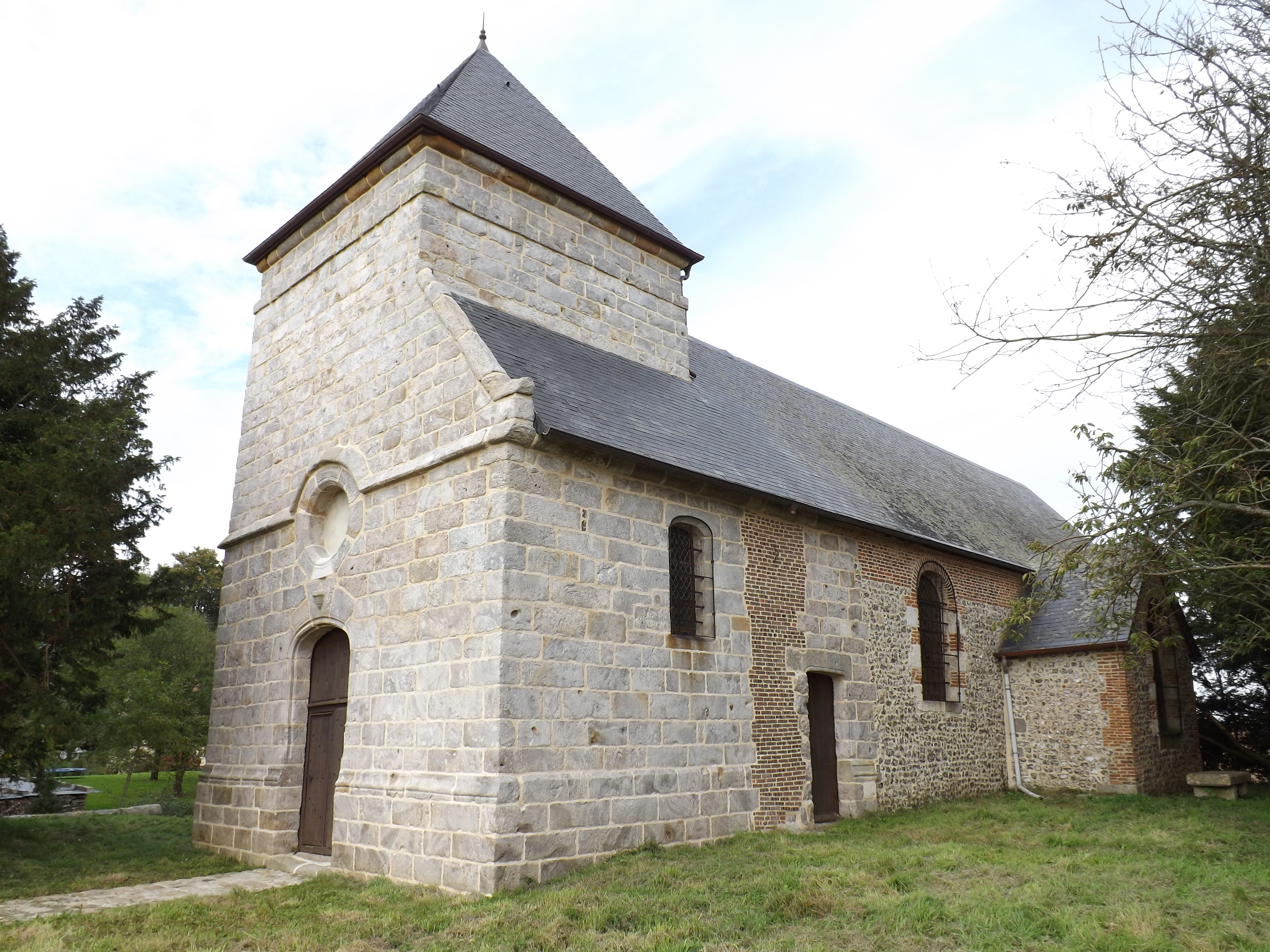
- The chapel of Flamanvillette

- Coat of arms
- Location of Sasseville
- Location within France Location within Normandy
- Coordinates: 49°47′19″N 0°40′56″E
- Country: France
- Region: Normandy
- Department: Seine-Maritime
- Arrondissement: Dieppe
- Canton: Saint-Valery-en-Caux
- Intercommunality: CC Côte d'Albâtre

Government
  - Mayor (2026–32): Rémi Herouard
- Area^{1}: 6.19 km^{2} (2.39 sq mi)
- Elevation: 123 m (404 ft)
- Highest elevation: 127 m (417 ft)
- Lowest elevation: 44 m (144 ft)
- Population (2023): 250
  - Density: 40/km^{2} (100/sq mi)
- Time zone: UTC+01:00 (CET)
  - Summer (DST): UTC+02:00 (CEST)
- INSEE/Postal code: 76664 /76450
- ^{1} French Land Register data, which excludes lakes, ponds, glaciers > 1 km^{2} (0.386 sq mi or 247 acres) and river estuaries.

Sasseville (French pronunciation: [sasvil]) is a commune in the Seine-Maritime department in the Normandy region in northern France.

== Geography ==
A small farming village situated in the valley of the river Durdent in the Pays de Caux, some 25 miles (40 km) southwest of Dieppe at the junction of the D50, D70 and the D925 roads.

== Population ==
Historical population
Year	Pop.	±% p.a.
1968	145	—
1975	119	−2.78%
1982	159	+4.23%
1990	302	+8.35%
1999	270	−1.24%
2007	290	+0.90%
2012	279	−0.77%
2017	273	−0.43%
2023	250	−1.46%
Source: INSEE

== Places of interest ==
- The church of Notre-Dame, dating from the sixteenth century.
- The church of Notre-Dame at Flamanvillette, dating from the thirteenth century.
- Two 16th-century stone crosses.

== See also ==
- Communes of the Seine-Maritime department
