= Le Bourg-Dun =

- Commune
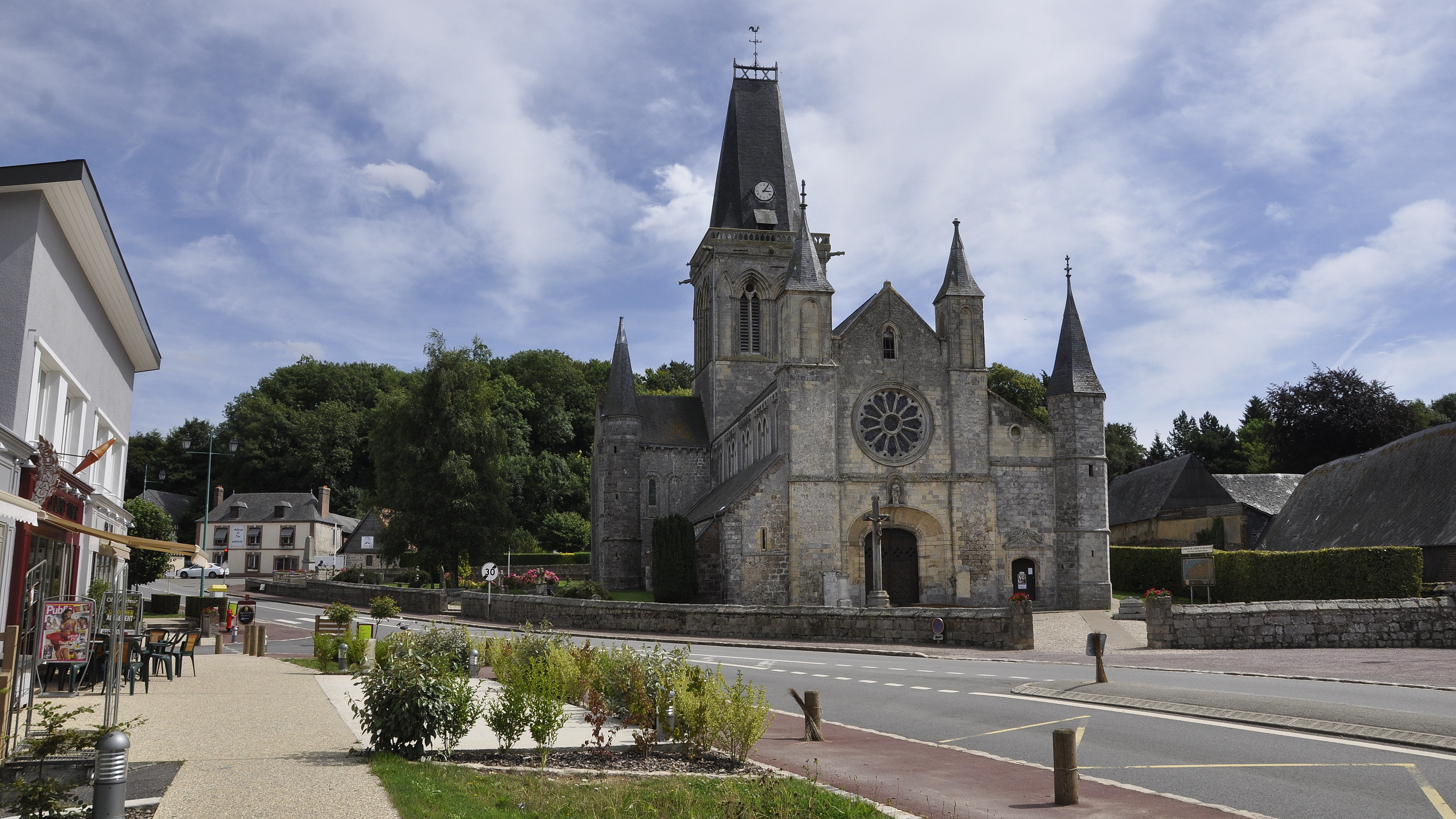
- The church in Le Bourg-Dun

- Coat of arms
- Location of Le Bourg-Dun
- Location within France Location within Normandy
- Coordinates: 49°52′02″N 0°53′16″E
- Country: France
- Region: Normandy
- Department: Seine-Maritime
- Arrondissement: Dieppe
- Canton: Saint-Valery-en-Caux
- Intercommunality: CC Côte d'Albâtre

Government
  - Mayor (2026–32): Philippe Dufour
- Area^{1}: 14.74 km^{2} (5.69 sq mi)
- Elevation: 17 m (56 ft)
- Highest elevation: 70 m (230 ft)
- Lowest elevation: 7 m (23 ft)
- Population (2023): 422
  - Density: 28.6/km^{2} (74.2/sq mi)
- Time zone: UTC+01:00 (CET)
  - Summer (DST): UTC+02:00 (CEST)
- INSEE/Postal code: 76133 /76740
- ^{1} French Land Register data, which excludes lakes, ponds, glaciers > 1 km^{2} (0.386 sq mi or 247 acres) and river estuaries.

Le Bourg-Dun (French pronunciation: [lə buʁ dœ̃], before 1993: Bourg-Dun) is a commune in the Seine-Maritime department in the Normandy region in northern France.

== Geography ==
A farming village, situated by the banks of the Dun river in the Pays de Caux, some 10 miles (16 km) southeast of Dieppe at the junction of the D237, the D101 and the D925 roads.

== Population ==
Historical population
Year	Pop.	±% p.a.
1968	514	—
1975	458	−1.63%
1982	419	−1.26%
1990	481	+1.74%
1999	440	−0.99%
2007	457	+0.47%
2012	423	−1.53%
2017	431	+0.38%
2023	422	−0.35%
Source: INSEE

== Places of interest ==
- A sixteenth century manorhouse at the hamlet of Flainville.
- St.Julien's chapel, dating from the fourteenth century.
- The church of Notre-Dame, dating from the thirteenth century.

== See also ==
- Communes of the Seine-Maritime department
