= Bouville, Seine-Maritime =

Bouville
- Commune
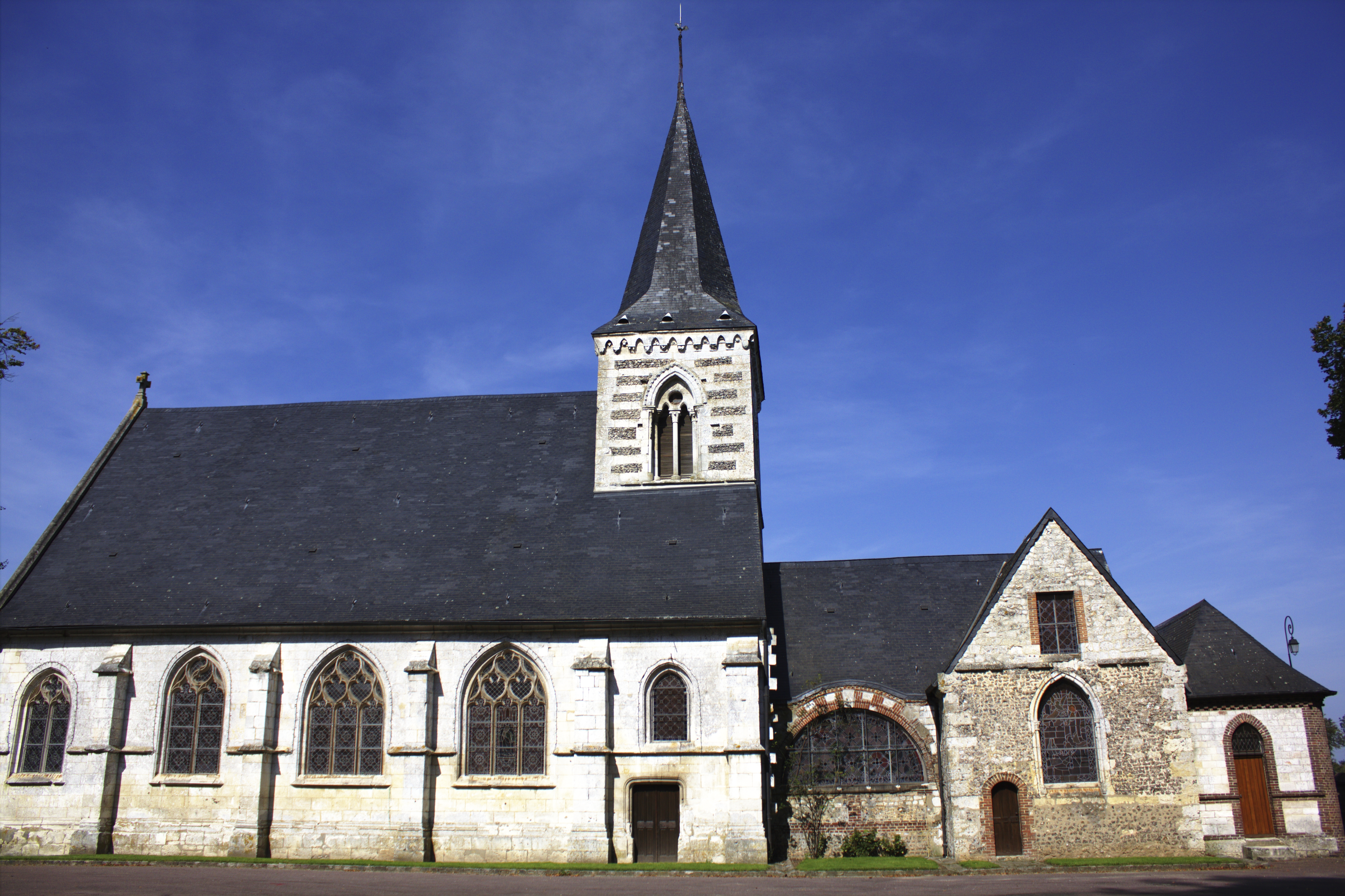
- The church in Bouville

- Coat of arms
- Location of Bouville
- Location within France Location within Normandy
- Coordinates: 49°33′48″N 0°53′41″E
- Country: France
- Region: Normandy
- Department: Seine-Maritime
- Arrondissement: Rouen
- Canton: Barentin

Government
  - Mayor (2026–32): Thierry Lermechain
- Area^{1}: 12.48 km^{2} (4.82 sq mi)
- Elevation: 115 m (377 ft)
- Highest elevation: 126 m (413 ft)
- Lowest elevation: 72 m (236 ft)
- Population (2023): 1,039
  - Density: 83.25/km^{2} (215.6/sq mi)
- Time zone: UTC+01:00 (CET)
  - Summer (DST): UTC+02:00 (CEST)
- INSEE/Postal code: 76135 /76360
- ^{1} French Land Register data, which excludes lakes, ponds, glaciers > 1 km^{2} (0.386 sq mi or 247 acres) and river estuaries.

Bouville (French pronunciation: [buvil]) is a commune in the Seine-Maritime department in the Normandy region in northern France. This farming village, situated in the Pays de Caux some 19 miles (31 km) northwest of Rouen, is at the junction of the D104, D22 and the D6015 roads.

== Heraldry ==
Arms of Bouville	The arms of Bouville are blazoned : Azure background, a golden chevron between 3 argent towers molded from sand .

== Population ==
Historical population
Year	Pop.	±% p.a.
1968	559	—
1975	576	+0.43%
1982	924	+6.98%
1990	1,020	+1.24%
1999	994	−0.29%
2007	914	−1.04%
2012	944	+0.65%
2017	982	+0.79%
2023	1,039	+0.94%
Source: INSEE

== Places of interest ==
- The church of Notre-Dame, dating from the twelfth century.
- Remains of a sixteenth-century castle.
- A fifteenth century cross.

== See also ==
- Communes of the Seine-Maritime department
