= Blacqueville =

- Commune
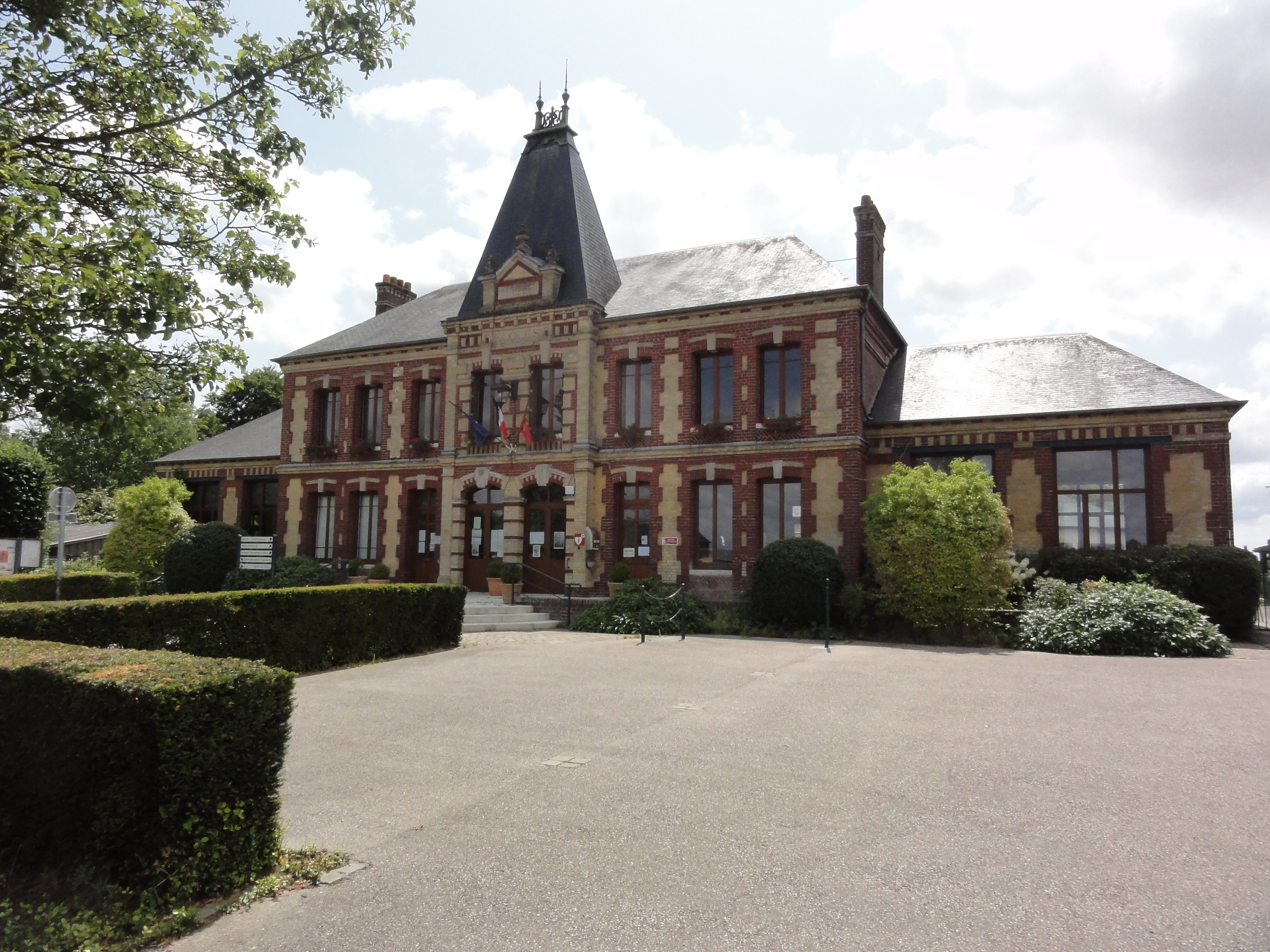
- Blacqueville Town hall
- Location of Blacqueville
- Location within France Location within Normandy
- Coordinates: 49°33′51″N 0°51′50″E
- Country: France
- Region: Normandy
- Department: Seine-Maritime
- Arrondissement: Rouen
- Canton: Barentin

Government
  - Mayor (2026–32): Sylvain Bulard
- Area^{1}: 10.02 km^{2} (3.87 sq mi)
- Elevation: 115 m (377 ft)
- Highest elevation: 143 m (469 ft)
- Lowest elevation: 37 m (121 ft)
- Population (2023): 660
  - Density: 66/km^{2} (170/sq mi)
- Time zone: UTC+01:00 (CET)
  - Summer (DST): UTC+02:00 (CEST)
- INSEE/Postal code: 76099 /76190
- ^{1} French Land Register data, which excludes lakes, ponds, glaciers > 1 km^{2} (0.386 sq mi or 247 acres) and river estuaries.

Blacqueville (French pronunciation: [blakvil]) is a commune in the Seine-Maritime department in the Normandy region in northern France.

== Geography ==
A farming village situated in the Pays de Caux 16 miles (26 km) northwest of Rouen, at the junction of the D263 and the D22 roads.

== Population ==
Historical population
Year	Pop.	±% p.a.
1968	340	—
1975	288	−2.34%
1982	446	+6.45%
1990	529	+2.16%
1999	536	+0.15%
2007	595	+1.31%
2012	623	+0.92%
2017	707	+2.56%
2023	660	−1.14%
Source: INSEE

== Places of interest ==
- The church of Notre-Dame, dating from the sixteenth century.
- A sixteenth-century stone cross.
- A dovecote.

== See also ==
- Communes of the Seine-Maritime department
