= Communes of the Seine-Maritime department =

List of the 707 communes of the French department of Seine-Maritime

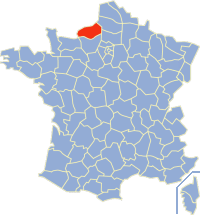

The following is a list of the 707 communes of the French department of Seine-Maritime.

The communes cooperate in the following intercommunalities (as of 2025):

- Métropole Rouen Normandie
- Communauté urbaine Le Havre Seine Métropole
- Communauté d'agglomération Caux Seine Agglo
- Communauté d'agglomération de Fécamp Caux Littoral
- Communauté d'agglomération de la Région Dieppoise
- Communauté de communes des 4 rivières (partly)
- Communauté de communes interrégionale Aumale - Blangy-sur-Bresle (partly)
- Communauté de communes Bray-Eawy
- Communauté de communes Campagne de Caux
- Communauté de communes Caux - Austreberthe
- Communauté de communes de la Côte d'Albâtre
- Communauté de communes Falaises du Talou
- Communauté de communes Inter-Caux-Vexin
- Communauté de communes de Londinières
- Communauté de communes Plateau de Caux
- Communauté de communes Roumois Seine (partly)
- Communauté de communes Terroir de Caux
- Communauté de communes des Villes Sœurs (partly)
- Communauté de communes Yvetot Normandie

INSEE code	Postal code	Commune
76001	76190	Allouville-Bellefosse
76002	76640	Alvimare
76004	76550	Ambrumesnil
76005	76920	Amfreville-la-Mi-Voie
76006	76560	Amfreville-les-Champs
76007	76710	Anceaumeville
76008	76370	Ancourt
76009	76560	Ancourteville-sur-Héricourt
76010	76760	Ancretiéville-Saint-Victor
76011	76540	Ancretteville-sur-Mer
76012	76110	Angerville-Bailleul
76013	76540	Angerville-la-Martel
76014	76280	Angerville-l'Orcher
76015	76740	Angiens
76016	76740	Anglesqueville-la-Bras-Long
76017	76280	Anglesqueville-l'Esneval
76020	76480	Anneville-Ambourville
76019	76590	Anneville-sur-Scie
76021	76110	Annouville-Vilmesnil
76022	76490	Anquetierville
76023	76560	Anvéville
76024	76680	Ardouval
76401	76940	Arelaune-en-Seine
76025	76780	Argueil
76026	76880	Arques-la-Bataille
76028	76390	Aubéguimont
76029	76340	Aubermesnil-aux-Érables
76030	76550	Aubermesnil-Beaumais
76032	76450	Auberville-la-Manuel
76033	76110	Auberville-la-Renault
76035	76390	Aumale
76036	76730	Auppegard
76038	76690	Authieux-Ratiéville
76039	76520	Les Authieux-sur-le-Port-Saint-Ouen
76040	76740	Autigny
76042	76270	Auvilliers
76043	76190	Auzebosc
76045	76760	Auzouville-l'Esneval
76046	76116	Auzouville-sur-Ry
76047	76730	Auzouville-sur-Saâne
76048	76220	Avesnes-en-Bray
76049	76630	Avesnes-en-Val
76050	76730	Avremesnil
76051	76730	Bacqueville-en-Caux
76052	76660	Bailleul-Neuville
76053	76660	Baillolet
76054	76630	Bailly-en-Rivière
76055	76190	Baons-le-Comte
76056	76480	Bardouville
76057	76360	Barentin
76058	76260	Baromesnil
76059	76340	Bazinval
76060	76440	Beaubec-la-Rosière
76062	76850	Beaumont-le-Hareng
76064	76280	Beaurepaire
76065	76870	Beaussault
76066	76890	Beautot
76063	76890	Beauval-en-Caux
76067	76220	Beauvoir-en-Lyons
76068	76110	Bec-de-Mortagne
76069	76240	Belbeuf
76070	76680	Bellencombre
76071	76630	Bellengreville
76072	76890	Belleville-en-Caux
76074	76440	La Bellière
76075	76590	Belmesnil
76076	76110	Bénarville
76077	76560	Bénesville
76079	76790	Bénouville
76082	76210	Bernières
76083	76450	Bertheauville
76084	76450	Bertreville
76085	76590	Bertreville-Saint-Ouen
76086	76890	Bertrimont
76087	76560	Berville-en-Caux
76088	76480	Berville-sur-Seine
76090	76210	Beuzeville-la-Grenier
76091	76450	Beuzeville-la-Guérard
76092	76210	Beuzevillette
76093	76220	Bézancourt
76094	76750	Bierville
76095	76420	Bihorel
76096	76890	Biville-la-Baignarde
76097	76730	Biville-la-Rivière
76099	76190	Blacqueville
76100	76116	Blainville-Crevon
76101	76340	Blangy-sur-Bresle
76104	76460	Blosseville
76105	76690	Le Bocasse
76106	76160	Bois-d'Ennebourg
76107	76750	Bois-Guilbert
76108	76230	Bois-Guillaume
76109	76750	Bois-Héroult
76110	76190	Bois-Himont
76111	76160	Bois-l'Évêque
76112	76590	Le Bois-Robert
76113	76750	Boissay
76114	76210	Bolbec
76115	76210	Bolleville
76103	76240	Bonsecours
76116	76520	Boos
76117	76790	Bordeaux-Saint-Clair
76118	76110	Bornambusc
76119	76680	Bosc-Bérenger
76120	76750	Bosc-Bordel
76121	76750	Bosc-Édeline
76123	76710	Bosc-Guérard-Saint-Adrien
76124	76220	Bosc-Hyons
76125	76850	Bosc-le-Hard
76126	76680	Bosc-Mesnil
76128	76450	Bosville
76129	76560	Boudeville
76130	76270	Bouelles
76131	76530	La Bouille
76132	76760	Bourdainville
76133	76740	Le Bourg-Dun
76134	76740	Bourville
76135	76360	Bouville
76136	76730	Brachy
76138	76850	Bracquetuit
76139	76680	Bradiancourt
76140	76740	Brametot
76141	76110	Bréauté
76142	76220	Brémontier-Merval
76143	76110	Bretteville-du-Grand-Caux
76144	76560	Bretteville-Saint-Laurent
76146	76750	Buchy
76147	76270	Bully
76148	76660	Bures-en-Bray
76149	76890	Butot
76732	76450	Butot-Vénesville
76151	76460	Cailleville
76152	76690	Cailly
76122	76270	Callengeville
76153	76890	Calleville-les-Deux-Églises
76154	76340	Campneuseville
76155	76260	Canehan
76156	76450	Canouville
76157	76380	Canteleu
76158	76560	Canville-les-Deux-Églises
76159	76450	Cany-Barville
76160	76190	Carville-la-Folletière
76161	76560	Carville-Pot-de-Fer
76162	76590	Le Catelier
76163	76116	Catenay
76165	76320	Caudebec-lès-Elbeuf
76166	76390	Le Caule-Sainte-Beuve
76167	76930	Cauville-sur-Mer
76168	76590	Les Cent-Acres
76169	76430	La Cerlangue
76170	76590	La Chapelle-du-Bourgay
76171	76780	La Chapelle-Saint-Ouen
76172	76740	La Chapelle-sur-Dun
76173	76590	La Chaussée
76174	76570	Cideville
76175	76660	Clais
76176	76450	Clasville
76177	76690	Claville-Motteville
76178	76410	Cléon
76179	76690	Clères
76180	76450	Cleuville
76181	76640	Cléville
76182	76640	Cliponville
76183	76400	Colleville
76184	76550	Colmesnil-Manneville
76185	76440	Compainville
76186	76390	Conteville
76187	76400	Contremoulins
76188	76850	Cottévrard
76189	76450	Crasville-la-Mallet
76190	76740	Crasville-la-Rocquefort
76192	76910	Criel-sur-Mer
76193	76850	La Crique
76194	76111	Criquebeuf-en-Caux
76195	76540	Criquetot-le-Mauconduit
76196	76280	Criquetot-l'Esneval
76197	76590	Criquetot-sur-Longueville
76198	76760	Criquetot-sur-Ouville
76199	76390	Criquiers
76200	76680	Critot
76201	76780	Croisy-sur-Andelle
76202	76660	Croixdalle
76203	76190	Croix-Mare
76204	76720	Cropus
76205	76590	Crosville-sur-Scie
76206	76280	Cuverville
76207	76260	Cuverville-sur-Yères
76208	76220	Cuy-Saint-Fiacre
76209	76220	Dampierre-en-Bray
76210	76510	Dampierre-Saint-Nicolas
76211	76340	Dancourt
76212	76160	Darnétal
76213	76110	Daubeuf-Serville
76214	76590	Dénestanville
76216	76250	Déville-lès-Rouen
76217	76200	Dieppe
76218	76220	Doudeauville
76219	76560	Doudeville
76220	76630	Douvrend
76221	76460	Drosay
76222	76480	Duclair
76223	76190	Écalles-Alix
76224	76110	Écrainville
76225	76190	Écretteville-lès-Baons
76226	76540	Écretteville-sur-Mer
76227	76760	Ectot-l'Auber
76228	76970	Ectot-lès-Baons
76231	76500	Elbeuf
76229	76220	Elbeuf-en-Bray
76230	76780	Elbeuf-sur-Andelle
76232	76540	Életot
76233	76390	Ellecourt
76234	76570	Émanville
76235	76630	Envermeu
76236	76640	Envronville
76237	76480	Épinay-sur-Duclair
76238	76133	Épouville
76239	76430	Épretot
76240	76400	Épreville
76241	76740	Ermenouville
76242	76220	Ernemont-la-Villette
76243	76750	Ernemont-sur-Buchy
76244	76270	Esclavelles
76245	76710	Eslettes
76247	76690	Esteville
76249	76850	Étaimpuis
76250	76430	Étainhus
76251	76560	Étalleville
76252	76260	Étalondes
76253	76190	Étoutteville
76254	76790	Étretat
76255	76260	Eu
76257	76340	Fallencourt
76259	76400	Fécamp
76260	76220	Ferrières-en-Bray
76261	76440	La Ferté-Saint-Samson
76262	76270	Fesques
76263	76220	La Feuillie
76264	76970	Flamanville
76265	76270	Flamets-Frétils
76266	76260	Flocques
76268	76280	Fongueusemare
76269	76440	Fontaine-en-Bray
76270	76290	Fontaine-la-Mallet
76271	76690	Fontaine-le-Bourg
76272	76740	Fontaine-le-Dun
76273	76160	Fontaine-sous-Préaux
76274	76890	La Fontelaye
76275	76290	Fontenay
76276	76440	Forges-les-Eaux
76278	76340	Foucarmont
76279	76640	Foucart
76475	76520	Franqueville-Saint-Pierre
76280	76660	Fréauville
76281	76170	La Frénaye
76282	76410	Freneuse
76283	76270	Fresles
76284	76850	Fresnay-le-Long
76285	76520	Fresne-le-Plan
76286	76660	Fresnoy-Folny
76287	76570	Fresquiennes
76288	76510	Freulleville
76290	76690	Frichemesnil
76291	76400	Froberville
76292	76780	Fry
76293	76560	Fultot
76294	76740	La Gaillarde
76295	76870	Gaillefontaine
76296	76700	Gainneville
76297	76220	Gancourt-Saint-Étienne
76298	76400	Ganzeville
76299	76540	Gerponville
76300	76790	Gerville
76302	76110	Goderville
76303	76430	Gommerville
76304	76110	Gonfreville-Caillot
76305	76700	Gonfreville-l'Orcher
76306	76730	Gonnetot
76307	76280	Gonneville-la-Mallet
76308	76590	Gonneville-sur-Scie
76309	76560	Gonzeville
76311	76570	Goupillières
76312	76220	Gournay-en-Bray
76313	76520	Gouy
76314	76430	Graimbouville
76315	76450	Grainville-la-Teinturière
76316	76116	Grainville-sur-Ry
76317	76110	Grainville-Ymauville
76318	76170	Grand-Camp
76319	76530	Grand-Couronne
76320	76660	Grandcourt
76321	76950	Les Grandes-Ventes
76322	76120	Le Grand-Quevilly
76323	76270	Graval
76324	76370	Grèges
76325	76970	Grémonville
76327	76810	Greuville
76328	76850	Grigneuseville
76329	76210	Gruchet-le-Valasse
76330	76810	Gruchet-Saint-Siméon
76331	76690	Grugny
76332	76440	Grumesnil
76333	76340	Guerville
76334	76730	Gueures
76335	76890	Gueutteville
76336	76460	Gueutteville-les-Grès
76338	76780	La Hallotière
76339	76450	Le Hanouard
76340	76560	Harcanville
76341	76700	Harfleur
76342	76640	Hattenville
76343	76440	Haucourt
76344	76390	Haudricourt
76345	76440	Haussez
76346	76450	Hautot-l'Auvray
76347	76190	Hautot-le-Vatois
76348	76190	Hautot-Saint-Sulpice
76349	76550	Hautot-sur-Mer
76350	76113	Hautot-sur-Seine
76041	76190	Les Hauts-de-Caux
76351	76600	Le Havre
76352	76780	La Haye
76353	76740	Héberville
76354	76840	Hénouville
76355	76560	Héricourt-en-Caux
76356	76730	Hermanville
76357	76280	Hermeville
76359	76750	Héronchelles
76360	76720	Heugleville-sur-Scie
76361	76280	Heuqueville
76362	76940	Heurteauville
76363	76340	Hodeng-au-Bosc
76364	76780	Hodeng-Hodenger
76365	76740	Houdetot
76366	76770	Le Houlme
76367	76770	Houppeville
76368	76110	Houquetot
76369	76690	La Houssaye-Béranger
76370	76570	Hugleville-en-Caux
76371	76630	Les Ifs
76372	76390	Illois
76373	76890	Imbleville
76374	76117	Incheville
76375	76460	Ingouville
76377	76230	Isneauville
76378	76480	Jumièges

INSEE code	Postal code	Commune
76379	76730	Lamberville
76380	76730	Lammerville
76381	76390	Landes-Vieilles-et-Neuves
76382	76210	Lanquetot
76383	76730	Lestanville
76384	76170	Lillebonne
76385	76570	Limésy
76386	76540	Limpiville
76387	76760	Lindebeuf
76388	76210	Lintot
76389	76590	Lintot-les-Bois
76390	76790	Les Loges
76391	76500	La Londe
76392	76660	Londinières
76393	76440	Longmesnil
76394	76260	Longroy
76395	76860	Longueil
76396	76750	Longuerue
76397	76590	Longueville-sur-Scie
76398	76490	Louvetot
76399	76270	Lucy
76400	76810	Luneray
76402	76770	Malaunay
76403	76450	Malleville-les-Grès
76404	76133	Manéglise
76405	76590	Manéhouville
76406	76400	Maniquerville
76407	76460	Manneville-ès-Plains
76408	76110	Manneville-la-Goupil
76409	76290	Mannevillette
76410	76150	Maromme
76411	76390	Marques
76412	76116	Martainville-Épreville
76413	76880	Martigny
76414	76370	Martin-Église
76415	76270	Massy
76416	76680	Mathonville
76417	76680	Maucomble
76418	76490	Maulévrier-Sainte-Gertrude
76419	76530	Mauny
76420	76440	Mauquenchy
76421	76170	Mélamare
76422	76260	Melleville
76423	76220	Ménerval
76424	76270	Ménonval
76425	76110	Mentheville
76426	76780	Mésangueville
76427	76270	Mesnières-en-Bray
76428	76460	Le Mesnil-Durdent
76429	76240	Le Mesnil-Esnard
76430	76660	Mesnil-Follemprise
76431	76780	Le Mesnil-Lieubray
76432	76440	Mesnil-Mauger
76433	76570	Mesnil-Panneville
76434	76520	Mesnil-Raoul
76435	76260	Le Mesnil-Réaume
76436	76480	Le Mesnil-sous-Jumièges
76437	76510	Meulers
76438	76260	Millebosc
76439	76210	Mirville
76440	76220	Molagnies
76441	76340	Monchaux-Soreng
76442	76260	Monchy-sur-Eu
76443	76690	Mont-Cauvaire
76445	76680	Montérolier
76446	76380	Montigny
76447	76290	Montivilliers
76448	76520	Montmain
76449	76850	Montreuil-en-Caux
76450	76220	Montroty
76451	76130	Mont-Saint-Aignan
76452	76710	Montville
76453	76750	Morgny-la-Pommeraye
76606	76390	Morienne
76454	76270	Mortemer
76455	76780	Morville-le-Héron
76456	76970	Motteville
76457	76530	Moulineaux
76458	76590	Muchedent
76459	76270	Nesle-Hodeng
76460	76340	Nesle-Normandeuse
76461	76680	Neufbosc
76462	76270	Neufchâtel-en-Bray
76463	76220	Neuf-Marché
76464	76520	La Neuville-Chant-d'Oisel
76465	76270	Neuville-Ferrières
76467	76460	Néville
76468	76210	Nointot
76469	76780	Nolléval
76470	76640	Normanville
76471	76330	Norville
76472	76510	Notre-Dame-d'Aliermont
76473	76940	Notre-Dame-de-Bliquetuit
76474	76960	Notre-Dame-de-Bondeville
76477	76133	Notre-Dame-du-Bec
76478	76590	Notre-Dame-du-Parc
76479	76390	Nullemont
76480	76450	Ocqueville
76481	76930	Octeville-sur-Mer
76482	76550	Offranville
76483	76560	Oherville
76484	76350	Oissel
76485	76730	Omonville
76486	76500	Orival
76487	76660	Osmoy-Saint-Valery
76488	76450	Ouainville
76489	76430	Oudalle
76490	76450	Ourville-en-Caux
76491	76760	Ouville-l'Abbaye
76492	76860	Ouville-la-Rivière
76493	76450	Paluel
76494	76210	Parc-d'Anxtot
76495	76570	Pavilly
76618	76370	Petit-Caux
76497	76650	Petit-Couronne
76498	76140	Le Petit-Quevilly
76499	76330	Petiville
76500	76340	Pierrecourt
76501	76280	Pierrefiques
76502	76750	Pierreval
76503	76360	Pissy-Pôville
76504	76460	Pleine-Sève
76505	76440	Pommereux
76506	76680	Pommeréval
76507	76260	Ponts-et-Marais
76476	76330	Port-Jérôme-sur-Seine
76508	76280	La Poterie-Cap-d'Antifer
76509	76160	Préaux
76510	76560	Prétot-Vicquemare
76511	76660	Preuseville
76512	76660	Puisenval
76513	76840	Quevillon
76514	76520	Quévreville-la-Poterie
76515	76860	Quiberville
76516	76270	Quièvrecourt
76517	76230	Quincampoix
76518	76210	Raffetot
76519	76730	Rainfreville
76520	76340	Réalcamp
76521	76750	Rebets
76522	76430	La Remuée
76523	76340	Rétonval
76524	76560	Reuville
76526	76510	Ricarville-du-Val
76527	76390	Richemont
76528	76340	Rieux
76164	76490	Rives-en-Seine
76529	76540	Riville
76530	76560	Robertot
76531	76640	Rocquefort
76532	76680	Rocquemont
76533	76700	Rogerville
76534	76133	Rolleville
76535	76440	Roncherolles-en-Bray
76536	76160	Roncherolles-sur-le-Vivier
76537	76390	Ronchois
76538	76680	Rosay
76540	76000	Rouen
76541	76480	Roumare
76542	76560	Routes
76543	76210	Rouville
76544	76440	Rouvray-Catillon
76545	76370	Rouxmesnil-Bouteilles
76546	76730	Royville
76547	76690	La Rue-Saint-Pierre
76548	76116	Ry
76549	76730	Saâne-Saint-Just
76550	76113	Sahurs
76551	76430	Sainneville
76554	76116	Saint-Aignan-sur-Ry
76555	76690	Saint-André-sur-Cailly
76556	76170	Saint-Antoine-la-Forêt
76557	76490	Saint-Arnoult
76558	76520	Saint-Aubin-Celloville
76559	76190	Saint-Aubin-de-Crétot
76560	76160	Saint-Aubin-Épinay
76562	76510	Saint-Aubin-le-Cauf
76561	76410	Saint-Aubin-lès-Elbeuf
76563	76430	Saint-Aubin-Routot
76564	76740	Saint-Aubin-sur-Mer
76565	76550	Saint-Aubin-sur-Scie
76568	76190	Saint-Clair-sur-les-Monts
76570	76590	Saint-Crespin
76572	76860	Saint-Denis-d'Aclon
76573	76116	Saint-Denis-le-Thiboult
76574	76890	Saint-Denis-sur-Scie
76552	76310	Sainte-Adresse
76553	76660	Sainte-Agathe-d'Aliermont
76566	76570	Sainte-Austreberthe
76567	76270	Sainte-Beuve-en-Rivière
76569	76460	Sainte-Colombe
76571	76750	Sainte-Croix-sur-Buchy
76577	76590	Sainte-Foy
76578	76440	Sainte-Geneviève
76587	76400	Sainte-Hélène-Bondeville
76608	76480	Sainte-Marguerite-sur-Duclair
76605	76119	Sainte-Marguerite-sur-Mer
76609	76280	Sainte-Marie-au-Bosc
76610	76190	Sainte-Marie-des-Champs
76575	76800	Saint-Étienne-du-Rouvray
76576	76210	Saint-Eustache-la-Forêt
76580	76690	Saint-Georges-sur-Fontaine
76581	76750	Saint-Germain-des-Essourts
76582	76590	Saint-Germain-d'Étables
76583	76690	Saint-Germain-sous-Cailly
76584	76270	Saint-Germain-sur-Eaulne
76585	76490	Saint-Gilles-de-Crétot
76586	76430	Saint-Gilles-de-la-Neuville
76588	76680	Saint-Hellier
76589	76590	Saint-Honoré
76590	76510	Saint-Jacques-d'Aliermont
76591	76160	Saint-Jacques-sur-Darnétal
76592	76170	Saint-Jean-de-Folleville
76593	76210	Saint-Jean-de-la-Neuville
76594	76150	Saint-Jean-du-Cardonnay
76595	76280	Saint-Jouin-Bruneval
76596	76700	Saint-Laurent-de-Brèvedent
76597	76560	Saint-Laurent-en-Caux
76598	76340	Saint-Léger-aux-Bois
76599	76160	Saint-Léger-du-Bourg-Denis
76600	76400	Saint-Léonard
76601	76780	Saint-Lucien
76602	76890	Saint-Maclou-de-Folleville
76603	76110	Saint-Maclou-la-Brière
76604	76730	Saint-Mards
76612	76340	Saint-Martin-au-Bosc
76611	76760	Saint-Martin-aux-Arbres
76613	76450	Saint-Martin-aux-Buneaux
76614	76840	Saint-Martin-de-Boscherville
76289	76190	Saint-Martin-de-l'If
76615	76133	Saint-Martin-du-Bec
76616	76290	Saint-Martin-du-Manoir
76617	76160	Saint-Martin-du-Vivier
76619	76260	Saint-Martin-le-Gaillard
76620	76270	Saint-Martin-l'Hortier
76621	76680	Saint-Martin-Osmonville
76622	76330	Saint-Maurice-d'Ételan
76623	76440	Saint-Michel-d'Halescourt
76624	76510	Saint-Nicolas-d'Aliermont
76626	76490	Saint-Nicolas-de-la-Haie
76627	76170	Saint-Nicolas-de-la-Taille
76628	76890	Saint-Ouen-du-Breuil
76629	76730	Saint-Ouen-le-Mauger
76630	76630	Saint-Ouen-sous-Bailly
76631	76480	Saint-Paër
76632	76890	Saint-Pierre-Bénouville
76634	76113	Saint-Pierre-de-Manneville
76635	76660	Saint-Pierre-des-Jonquières
76636	76480	Saint-Pierre-de-Varengeville
76637	76540	Saint-Pierre-en-Port
76638	76260	Saint-Pierre-en-Val
76640	76320	Saint-Pierre-lès-Elbeuf
76641	76740	Saint-Pierre-le-Vieux
76642	76740	Saint-Pierre-le-Viger
76644	76260	Saint-Rémy-Boscrocourt
76645	76340	Saint-Riquier-en-Rivière
76646	76460	Saint-Riquier-ès-Plains
76647	76430	Saint-Romain-de-Colbosc
76648	76680	Saint-Saëns
76649	76270	Saint-Saire
76650	76110	Saint-Sauveur-d'Émalleville
76651	76460	Saint-Sylvain
76652	76510	Saint-Vaast-d'Équiqueville
76653	76450	Saint-Vaast-Dieppedalle
76654	76890	Saint-Vaast-du-Val
76655	76460	Saint-Valery-en-Caux
76656	76890	Saint-Victor-l'Abbaye
76657	76430	Saint-Vigor-d'Ymonville
76658	76430	Saint-Vincent-Cramesnil
76660	76430	Sandouville
76662	76730	Sassetot-le-Malgardé
76663	76540	Sassetot-le-Mauconduit
76664	76450	Sasseville
76665	76630	Sauchay
76666	76440	Saumont-la-Poterie
76667	76550	Sauqueville
76668	76760	Saussay
76669	76110	Sausseuzemare-en-Caux
76670	76400	Senneville-sur-Fécamp
76671	76260	Sept-Meules
76672	76440	Serqueux
76673	76116	Servaville-Salmonville
76675	76690	Sierville
76676	76780	Sigy-en-Bray
76677	76660	Smermesnil
76678	76440	Sommery
76679	76560	Sommesnil
76680	76540	Sorquainville
76681	76300	Sotteville-lès-Rouen
76682	76410	Sotteville-sous-le-Val
76683	76740	Sotteville-sur-Mer
76684	76430	Tancarville
76258	76640	Terres-de-Caux
76685	76540	Thérouldeville
76686	76540	Theuville-aux-Maillots
76688	76540	Thiergeville
76689	76540	Thiétreville
76690	76730	Thil-Manneville
76691	76440	Le Thil-Riberpré
76692	76450	Thiouville
76693	76790	Le Tilleul
76694	76730	Tocqueville-en-Caux
76695	76110	Tocqueville-les-Murs
76697	76590	Torcy-le-Grand
76698	76590	Torcy-le-Petit
76699	76560	Le Torp-Mesnil
76700	76890	Tôtes
76702	76190	Touffreville-la-Corbeline
76703	76910	Touffreville-sur-Eu
76705	76410	Tourville-la-Rivière
76706	76400	Tourville-les-Ifs
76707	76550	Tourville-sur-Arques
76708	76400	Toussaint
76709	76580	Le Trait
76710	76640	Trémauville
76711	76470	Le Tréport
76712	76170	La Trinité-du-Mont
76714	76430	Les Trois-Pierres
76715	76210	Trouville-Alliquerville
76716	76280	Turretot
76717	76380	Val-de-la-Haye
76018	76890	Val-de-Saâne
76034	76720	Val-de-Scie
76718	76190	Valliquerville
76719	76540	Valmont
76720	76119	Varengeville-sur-Mer
76721	76890	Varneville-Bretteville
76723	76890	Vassonville
76724	76270	Vatierville
76725	76110	Vattetot-sous-Beaumont
76726	76111	Vattetot-sur-Mer
76727	76940	Vatteville-la-Rue
76728	76150	La Vaupalière
76730	76560	Veauville-lès-Quelles
76731	76730	Vénestanville
76733	76680	Ventes-Saint-Rémy
76734	76280	Vergetot
76735	76980	Veules-les-Roses
76736	76450	Veulettes-sur-Mer
76737	76760	Vibeuf
76738	76750	Vieux-Manoir
76739	76390	Vieux-Rouen-sur-Bresle
76740	76160	La Vieux-Rue
76741	76280	Villainville
76743	76360	Villers-Écalles
76744	76340	Villers-sous-Foucarmont
76745	76260	Villy-sur-Yères
76746	76540	Vinnemerville
76747	76110	Virville
76748	76450	Vittefleur
76749	76660	Wanchy-Capval
76750	76480	Yainville
76751	76640	Yébleron
76752	76760	Yerville
76753	76520	Ymare
76754	76111	Yport
76755	76540	Ypreville-Biville
76756	76690	Yquebeuf
76757	76560	Yvecrique
76758	76190	Yvetot
76759	76530	Yville-sur-Seine
