= Bourville =

- Commune
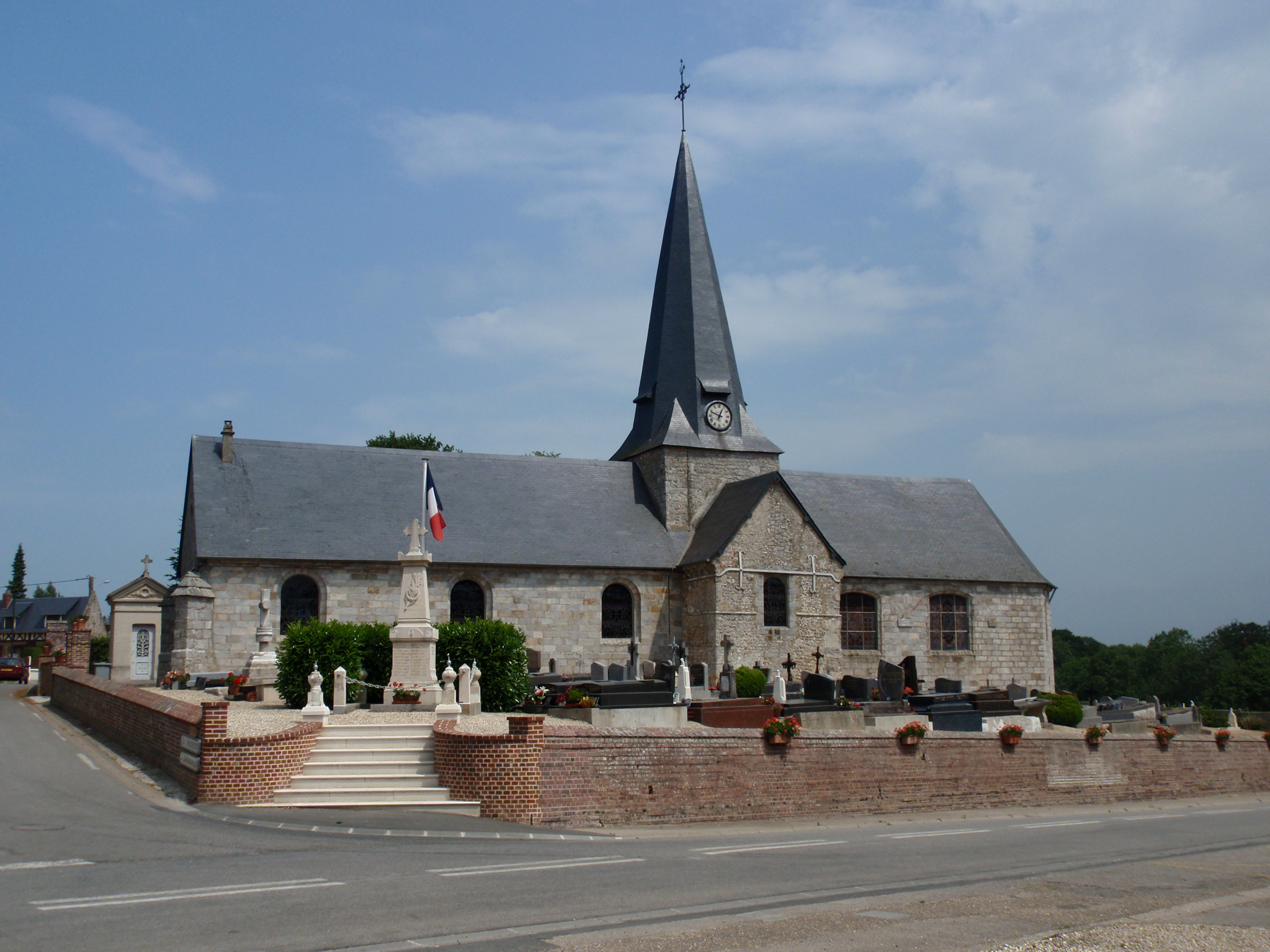
- The church in Bourville
- Location of Bourville
- Location within France Location within Normandy
- Coordinates: 49°47′44″N 0°49′15″E
- Country: France
- Region: Normandy
- Department: Seine-Maritime
- Arrondissement: Dieppe
- Canton: Saint-Valery-en-Caux
- Intercommunality: CC Côte d'Albâtre

Government
  - Mayor (2026–32): Denis Bellard
- Area^{1}: 6.61 km^{2} (2.55 sq mi)
- Elevation: 90 m (300 ft)
- Highest elevation: 114 m (374 ft)
- Lowest elevation: 63 m (207 ft)
- Population (2023): 276
  - Density: 41.8/km^{2} (108/sq mi)
- Time zone: UTC+01:00 (CET)
  - Summer (DST): UTC+02:00 (CEST)
- INSEE/Postal code: 76134 /76740
- ^{1} French Land Register data, which excludes lakes, ponds, glaciers > 1 km^{2} (0.386 sq mi or 247 acres) and river estuaries.

Bourville (French pronunciation: [buʁvil]) is a commune in the Seine-Maritime department, region of Normandy, northern France

== Geography ==
A farming village situated in the Pays de Caux, some 20 miles (32 km) southwest of Dieppe, at the junction of the D108 and the D237 roads.

== Population ==
Historical population
Year	Pop.	±% p.a.
1968	433	—
1975	373	−2.11%
1982	410	+1.36%
1990	318	−3.13%
1999	313	−0.18%
2007	293	−0.82%
2012	294	+0.07%
2017	297	+0.20%
2023	276	−1.21%
Source: INSEE

== Places of interest ==
- The church of St. Martin, dating from the twelfth century.
- The seventeenth-century chateau de Tonneville.
- The seventeenth-century church at Tonneville.

== Notable people ==
- Actor Bourvil (André Raimbourg) spent all his childhood in the village and its name inspired his stage name.

== See also ==
- Communes of the Seine-Maritime department
