= Ermenouville =

- Commune
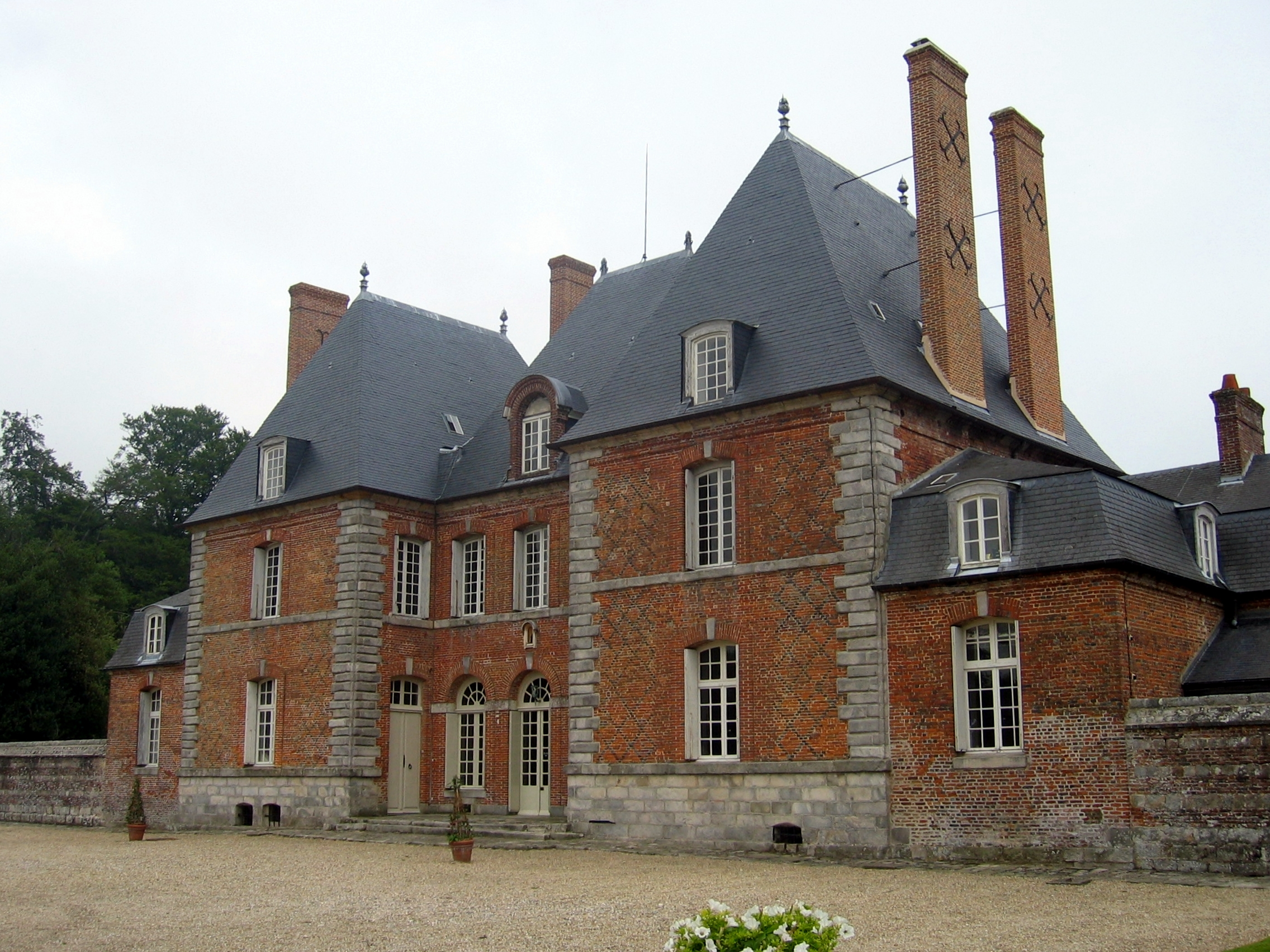
- The chateau of Le Mesnil-Geffroy
- Location of Ermenouville
- Location within France Location within Normandy
- Coordinates: 49°48′00″N 0°47′21″E
- Country: France
- Region: Normandy
- Department: Seine-Maritime
- Arrondissement: Dieppe
- Canton: Saint-Valery-en-Caux
- Intercommunality: CC Côte d'Albâtre

Government
  - Mayor (2026–32): Daniel Seigneur
- Area^{1}: 3.7 km^{2} (1.4 sq mi)
- Elevation: 80 m (260 ft)
- Highest elevation: 109 m (358 ft)
- Lowest elevation: 77 m (253 ft)
- Population (2023): 116
  - Density: 31/km^{2} (81/sq mi)
- Time zone: UTC+01:00 (CET)
  - Summer (DST): UTC+02:00 (CEST)
- INSEE/Postal code: 76241 /76740
- ^{1} French Land Register data, which excludes lakes, ponds, glaciers > 1 km^{2} (0.386 sq mi or 247 acres) and river estuaries.

Ermenouville (French pronunciation: [ɛʁmənuvil]) is a commune in the Seine-Maritime department in the Normandy region in northern France.

== Geography ==
A small village of forestry and farming situated in the Pays de Caux, some 20 miles (32 km) southwest of Dieppe, at the junction of the D37 and the D108 roads.

== Population ==
Historical population
Year	Pop.	±% p.a.
1968	235	—
1975	217	−1.13%
1982	198	−1.30%
1990	181	−1.12%
1999	154	−1.78%
2007	155	+0.08%
2012	149	−0.79%
2017	140	−1.24%
2023	116	−3.09%
Source: INSEE

== Places of interest ==
- The Château d'Arnouville
- The seventeenth century Château du Mesnil-Geffroy and its park.
- The church of Notre-Dame, dating from the nineteenth century.
- The church of St. Ouen, dating from the sixteenth century.

== See also ==
- Communes of the Seine-Maritime department
