= Houdetot =

- Commune
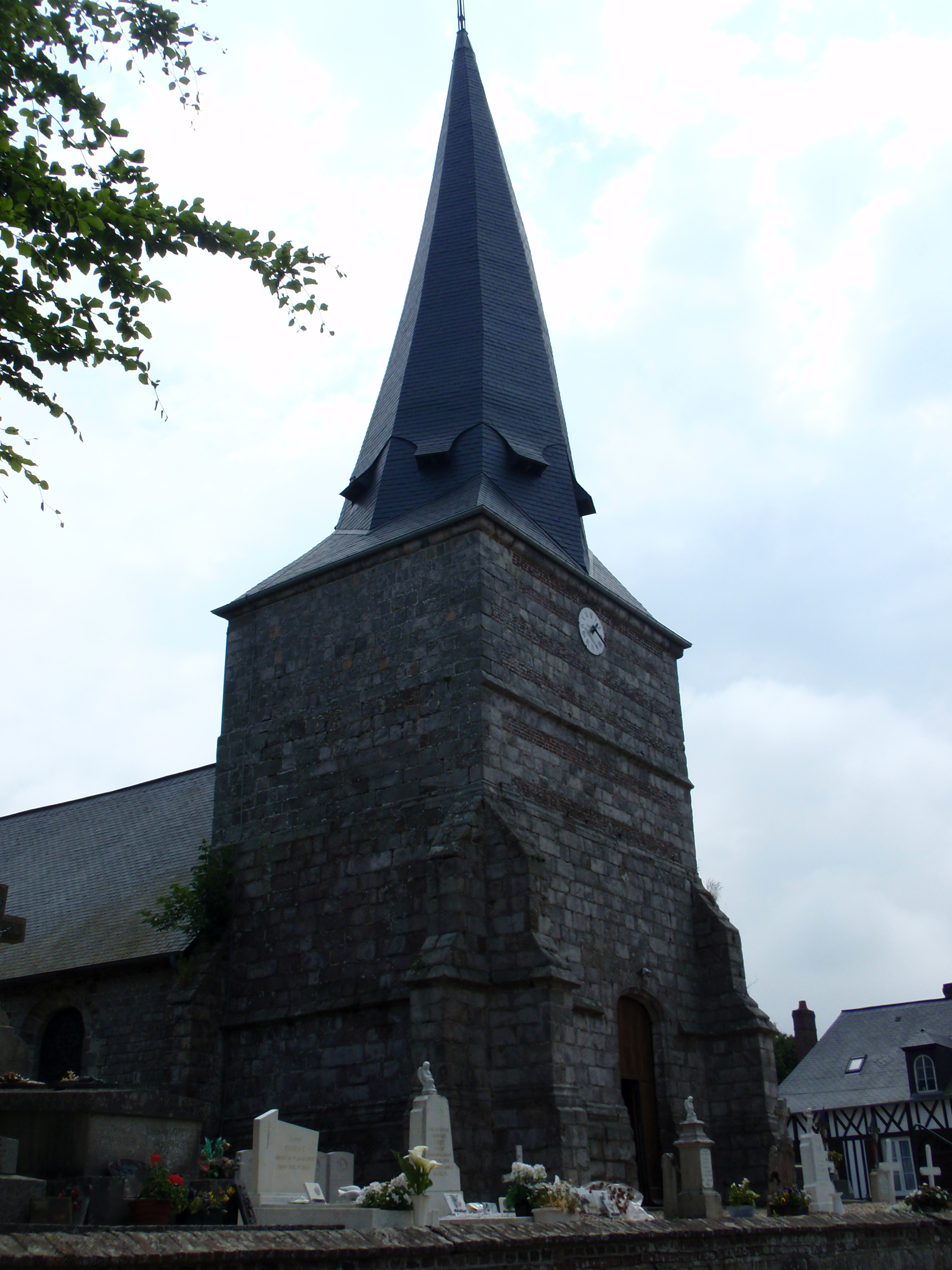
- The church in Houdetot
- Location of Houdetot
- Location within France Location within Normandy
- Coordinates: 49°48′54″N 0°48′14″E
- Country: France
- Region: Normandy
- Department: Seine-Maritime
- Arrondissement: Dieppe
- Canton: Saint-Valery-en-Caux
- Intercommunality: CC Côte d'Albâtre

Government
  - Mayor (2026–32): Jean-Paul Renaux
- Area^{1}: 5.77 km^{2} (2.23 sq mi)
- Elevation: 85 m (279 ft)
- Highest elevation: 103 m (338 ft)
- Lowest elevation: 63 m (207 ft)
- Population (2023): 202
  - Density: 35.0/km^{2} (90.7/sq mi)
- Time zone: UTC+01:00 (CET)
  - Summer (DST): UTC+02:00 (CEST)
- INSEE/Postal code: 76365 /76740
- ^{1} French Land Register data, which excludes lakes, ponds, glaciers > 1 km^{2} (0.386 sq mi or 247 acres) and river estuaries.

Houdetot is a commune in the Seine-Maritime department in the Normandy region in northern France.

== Geography ==
A small farming village in the Pays de Caux situated some 17 miles (27 km) southwest of Dieppe at the junction of the D70 and the D437 roads.

== Population ==
Historical population
Year	Pop.	±% p.a.
1968	167	—
1975	153	−1.24%
1982	135	−1.77%
1990	136	+0.09%
1999	135	−0.08%
2007	162	+2.31%
2012	167	+0.61%
2017	180	+1.51%
2023	202	+1.94%
Source: INSEE

== Places of interest ==
- The church of St.Pierre, dating from the thirteenth century.
- Traces of a castle dating from medieval times.

== See also ==
- Communes of the Seine-Maritime department
