= Anglesqueville-la-Bras-Long =

- Commune
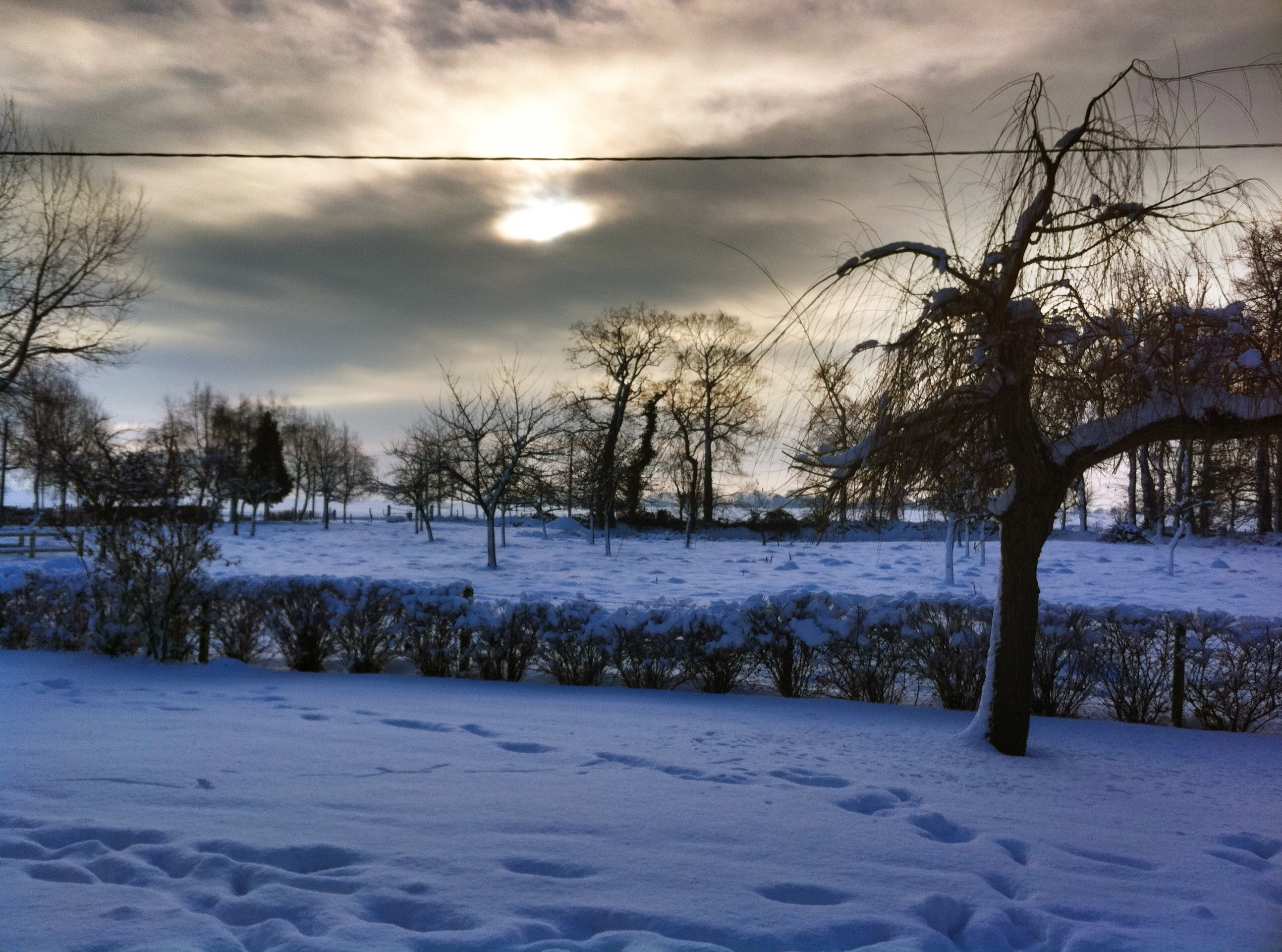
- Anglesqueville in winter
- Location of Anglesqueville-la-Bras-Long
- Location within France Location within Normandy
- Coordinates: 49°46′52″N 0°46′59″E
- Country: France
- Region: Normandy
- Department: Seine-Maritime
- Arrondissement: Dieppe
- Canton: Saint-Valery-en-Caux
- Intercommunality: Côte d'Albâtre

Government
  - Mayor (2020–2026): Bruno Naze
- Area^{1}: 3.53 km^{2} (1.36 sq mi)
- Elevation: 126 m (413 ft)
- Highest elevation: 128 m (420 ft)
- Lowest elevation: 93 m (305 ft)
- Population (2023): 134
  - Density: 38.0/km^{2} (98.3/sq mi)
- Time zone: UTC+01:00 (CET)
  - Summer (DST): UTC+02:00 (CEST)
- INSEE/Postal code: 76016 /76740
- ^{1} French Land Register data, which excludes lakes, ponds, glaciers > 1 km^{2} (0.386 sq mi or 247 acres) and river estuaries.

Anglesqueville-la-Bras-Long is a commune in the Seine-Maritime département of the Normandy region of northern France.

== Geography ==
A small farming village situated in the Pays de Caux, some 20 miles (32 km) southwest of Dieppe, at the junction of the D20 and D107 roads.

== Population ==
Historical population
Year	Pop.	±% p.a.
1968	154	—
1975	129	−2.50%
1982	121	−0.91%
1990	129	+0.80%
1999	135	+0.51%
2007	126	−0.86%
2012	116	−1.64%
2017	117	+0.17%
2023	134	+2.29%
Source: INSEE

== Places of interest ==
- The church of St. Anne, dating from the thirteenth century.
- The château de Beaumont, dating from the twelfth century
- A sandstone cross, built in 1535.

== See also ==
- Communes of the Seine-Maritime department
