= Héberville =

- Commune
- Location of Héberville
- Location within France Location within Normandy
- Coordinates: 49°46′37″N 0°48′10″E
- Country: France
- Region: Normandy
- Department: Seine-Maritime
- Arrondissement: Dieppe
- Canton: Saint-Valery-en-Caux
- Intercommunality: CC Côte d'Albâtre

Government
  - Mayor (2026–32): Karine Battistella
- Area^{1}: 3.99 km^{2} (1.54 sq mi)
- Elevation: 140 m (460 ft)
- Highest elevation: 126 m (413 ft)
- Lowest elevation: 90 m (300 ft)
- Population (2023): 100
  - Density: 25/km^{2} (65/sq mi)
- Time zone: UTC+01:00 (CET)
  - Summer (DST): UTC+02:00 (CEST)
- INSEE/Postal code: 76353 /76740
- ^{1} French Land Register data, which excludes lakes, ponds, glaciers > 1 km^{2} (0.386 sq mi or 247 acres) and river estuaries.

Héberville is a commune in the Seine-Maritime department in the Normandy region in north-western France.

== Geography ==
A small farming village in the Pays de Caux situated some 21 miles (34 km) southwest of Dieppe at the junction of the D107 and the D237 roads.

== Population ==
Historical population
| Year | Pop. | ±% p.a. |
|---|---|---|
| 1968 | 189 | — |
| 1975 | 180 | −0.69% |
| 1982 | 160 | −1.67% |
| 1990 | 115 | −4.04% |
| 1999 | 115 | +0.00% |
| 2007 | 119 | +0.43% |
| 2012 | 103 | −2.85% |
| 2017 | 116 | +2.41% |
| 2023 | 100 | −2.44% |
Source: INSEE

== Places of interest ==
- The church of Notre-Dame, dating from the nineteenth century.
- A seventeenth-century stone cross.

== See also ==
- Communes of the Seine-Maritime department
