= Saint-Pierre-le-Vieux, Seine-Maritime =

Saint-Pierre-le-Vieux
- Commune
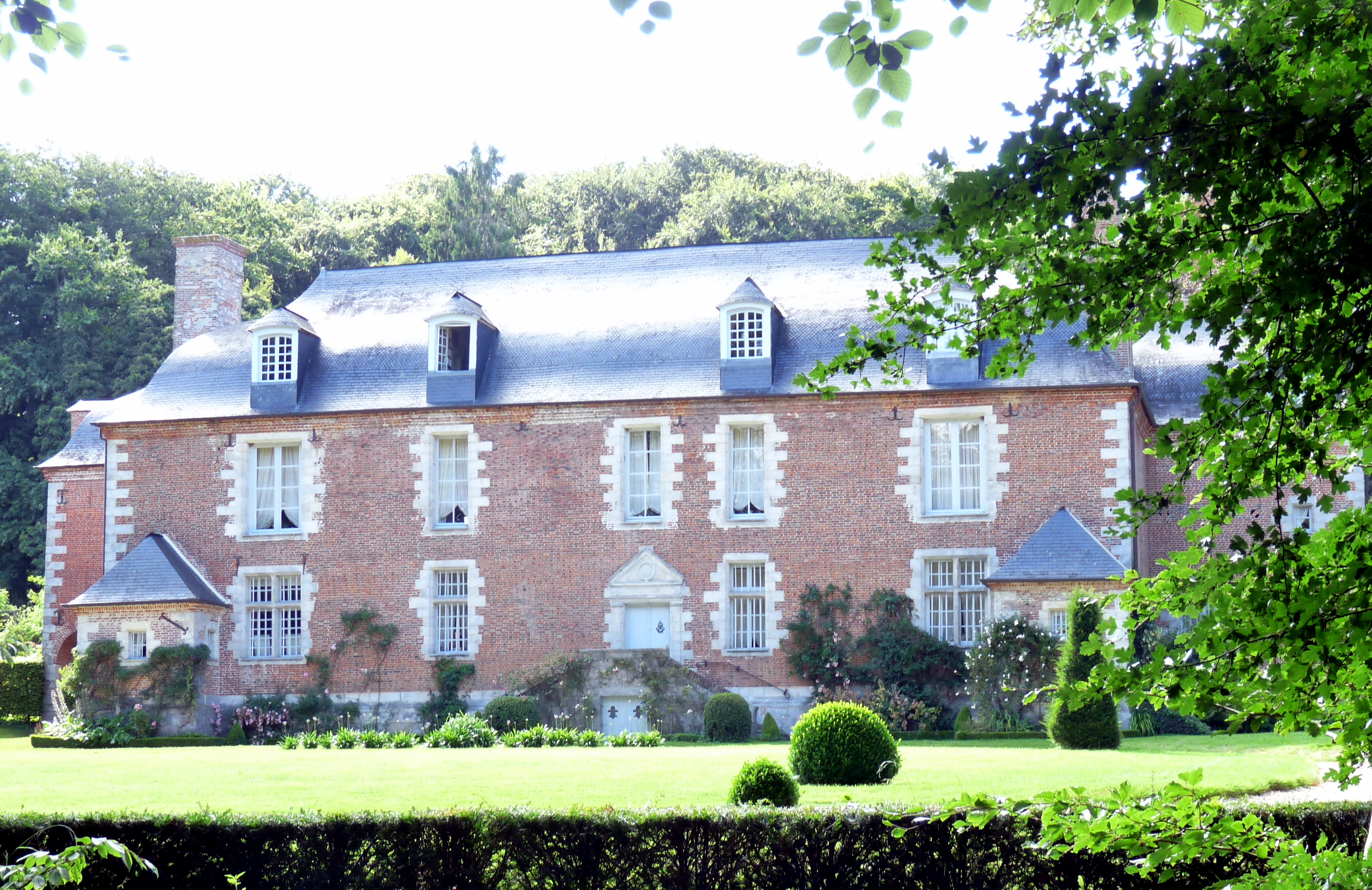
- The chateau of Herbouville in Saint-Pierre-le-Vieux
- Location of Saint-Pierre-le-Vieux
- Location within France Location within Normandy
- Coordinates: 49°51′04″N 0°52′24″E
- Country: France
- Region: Normandy
- Department: Seine-Maritime
- Arrondissement: Dieppe
- Canton: Saint-Valery-en-Caux
- Intercommunality: CC Côte d'Albâtre

Government
  - Mayor (2026–32): Emmanuel Boust
- Area^{1}: 7.06 km^{2} (2.73 sq mi)
- Elevation: 35 m (115 ft)
- Highest elevation: 71 m (233 ft)
- Lowest elevation: 18 m (59 ft)
- Population (2023): 183
  - Density: 25.9/km^{2} (67.1/sq mi)
- Time zone: UTC+01:00 (CET)
  - Summer (DST): UTC+02:00 (CEST)
- INSEE/Postal code: 76641 /76740
- ^{1} French Land Register data, which excludes lakes, ponds, glaciers > 1 km^{2} (0.386 sq mi or 247 acres) and river estuaries.

Saint-Pierre-le-Vieux (French pronunciation: [sɛ̃ pjɛʁ lə vjø]) is a commune in the Seine-Maritime department in the Normandy region in north-western France.

== Geography ==
A farming village situated by the banks of the Dun river in the Pays de Caux, some 19 miles (31 km) southwest of Dieppe at the junction of the D237 and the D101 roads.

== Population ==
Historical population
Year	Pop.	±% p.a.
1968	267	—
1975	254	−0.71%
1982	249	−0.28%
1990	203	−2.52%
1999	203	+0.00%
2007	218	+0.90%
2012	205	−1.22%
2017	192	−1.30%
2023	183	−0.80%
Source: INSEE

== Places of interest ==
- The church of St.Pierre, dating from the eleventh century.
- The sixteenth-century château de Saint-Pierre-le-Vieux, with a vaulted ceiling.
- The château and park of Bosc le Comte, dating from the sixteenth century.

== See also ==
- Communes of the Seine-Maritime department
