= La Chapelle-sur-Dun =

- Commune
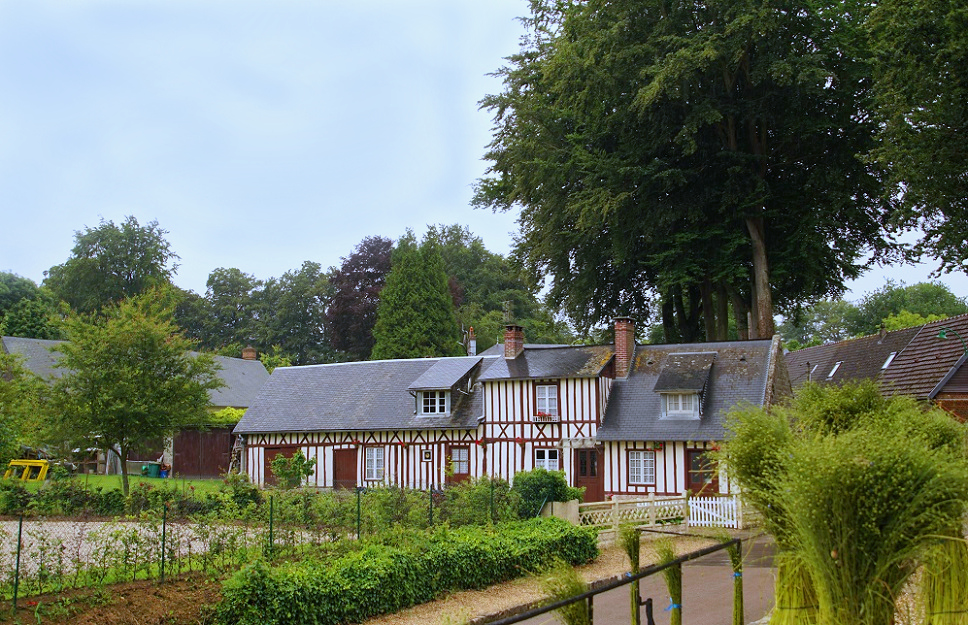
- The village of La Chapelle-sur-Dun
- Location of La Chapelle-sur-Dun
- Location within France Location within Normandy
- Coordinates: 49°51′39″N 0°50′58″E
- Country: France
- Region: Normandy
- Department: Seine-Maritime
- Arrondissement: Dieppe
- Canton: Saint-Valery-en-Caux
- Intercommunality: CC Côte d'Albâtre

Government
  - Mayor (2020–2026): Christophe Dubosc
- Area^{1}: 4.42 km^{2} (1.71 sq mi)
- Elevation: 49 m (161 ft)
- Highest elevation: 73 m (240 ft)
- Lowest elevation: 39 m (128 ft)
- Population (2023): 162
  - Density: 36.7/km^{2} (94.9/sq mi)
- Time zone: UTC+01:00 (CET)
  - Summer (DST): UTC+02:00 (CEST)
- INSEE/Postal code: 76172 /76740
- ^{1} French Land Register data, which excludes lakes, ponds, glaciers > 1 km^{2} (0.386 sq mi or 247 acres) and river estuaries.

La Chapelle-sur-Dun is a commune in the Seine-Maritime department in the Normandy region in northern France.

== Geography ==
A small farming village situated in the valley of the Dun river in the Pays de Caux, some 12 miles (19 km) southwest of Dieppe at the junction of the D75, the D925 and the D89 roads.

== Population ==
Historical population
Year	Pop.	±% p.a.
1968	337	—
1975	282	−2.51%
1982	242	−2.16%
1990	205	−2.05%
1999	207	+0.11%
2007	194	−0.81%
2012	180	−1.49%
2017	160	−2.33%
2023	162	+0.21%
Source: INSEE

== Places of interest ==
- The church of St.Jean, dating from the nineteenth century.
- The chateau.
- A fifteenth-century bridge over the river.

== See also ==
- Communes of the Seine-Maritime department
