= Crasville-la-Rocquefort =

- Commune
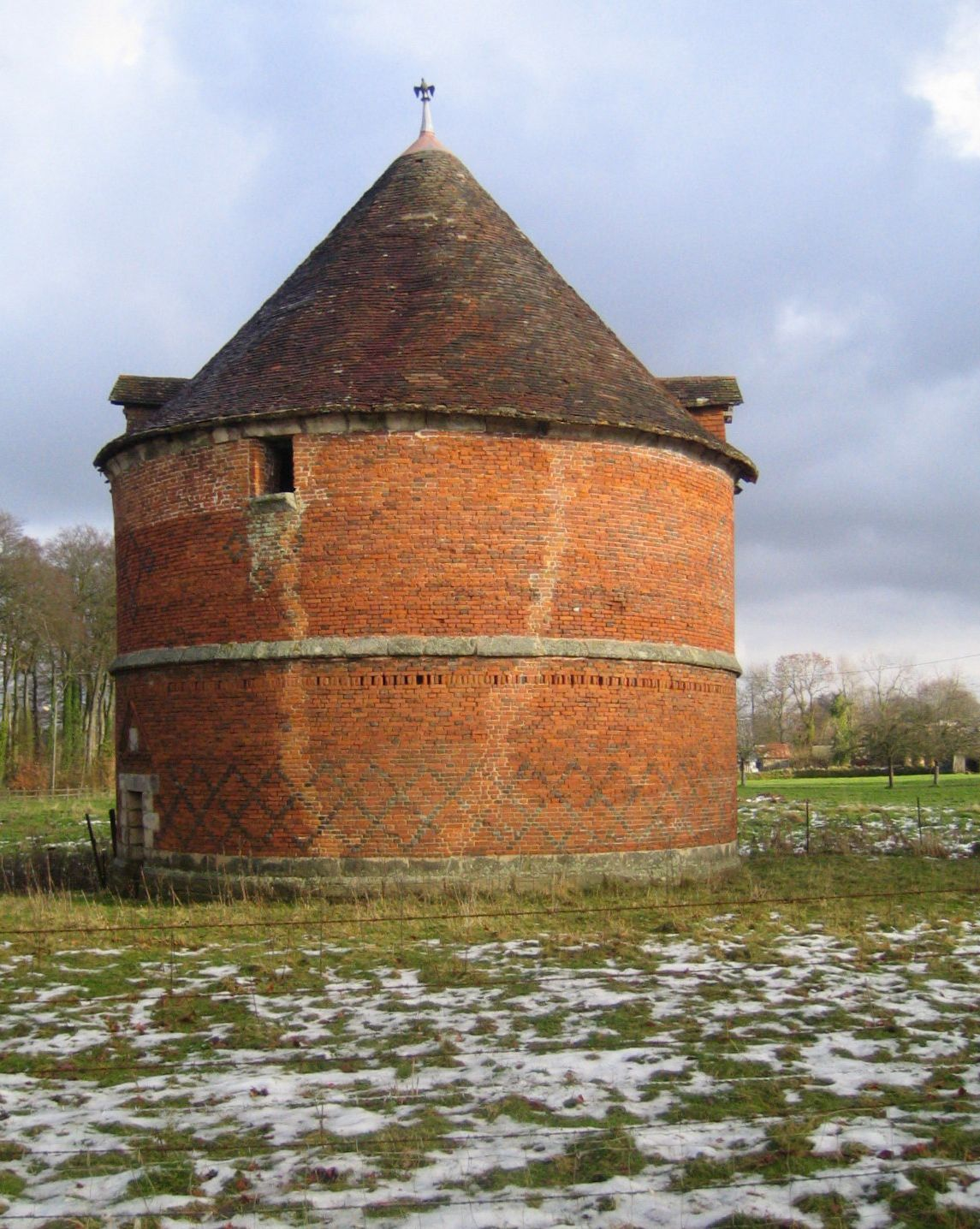
- The chateau's dovecote in Crasville-la-Rocquefort
- Location of Crasville-la-Rocquefort
- Location within France Location within Normandy
- Coordinates: 49°48′20″N 0°52′50″E
- Country: France
- Region: Normandy
- Department: Seine-Maritime
- Arrondissement: Dieppe
- Canton: Saint-Valery-en-Caux
- Intercommunality: CC Côte d'Albâtre

Government
  - Mayor (2020–2026): Patrice Faucon
- Area^{1}: 5.21 km^{2} (2.01 sq mi)
- Elevation: 95 m (312 ft)
- Highest elevation: 109 m (358 ft)
- Lowest elevation: 53 m (174 ft)
- Population (2023): 207
  - Density: 39.7/km^{2} (103/sq mi)
- Time zone: UTC+01:00 (CET)
  - Summer (DST): UTC+02:00 (CEST)
- INSEE/Postal code: 76190 /76740
- ^{1} French Land Register data, which excludes lakes, ponds, glaciers > 1 km^{2} (0.386 sq mi or 247 acres) and river estuaries.

Crasville-la-Rocquefort is a commune in the Seine-Maritime department in the Normandy region in northern France.

== Geography ==
A farming village situated in the Pays de Caux, some 15 miles (24 km) southwest of Dieppe, at the junction of the D108, D437 and the D102 roads.

== Population ==
Historical population
Year	Pop.	±% p.a.
1968	222	—
1975	223	+0.06%
1982	230	+0.44%
1990	300	+3.38%
1999	269	−1.20%
2007	227	−2.10%
2012	219	−0.71%
2017	214	−0.46%
2023	207	−0.55%
Source: INSEE

== Places of interest ==
- The church of St.Martin, dating from the sixteenth century.
- The chateau, built on the foundations of a feudal castle.

== See also ==
- Communes of the Seine-Maritime department
