= Brametot =

- Commune
- Location of Brametot
- Location within France Location within Normandy
- Coordinates: 49°47′10″N 0°52′04″E
- Country: France
- Region: Normandy
- Department: Seine-Maritime
- Arrondissement: Dieppe
- Canton: Saint-Valery-en-Caux
- Intercommunality: CC Côte d'Albâtre

Government
  - Mayor (2026–32): Jean-François Aligny
- Area^{1}: 3.21 km^{2} (1.24 sq mi)
- Elevation: 110 m (360 ft)
- Highest elevation: 126 m (413 ft)
- Lowest elevation: 82 m (269 ft)
- Population (2023): 199
  - Density: 62.0/km^{2} (161/sq mi)
- Time zone: UTC+01:00 (CET)
  - Summer (DST): UTC+02:00 (CEST)
- INSEE/Postal code: 76140 /76740
- ^{1} French Land Register data, which excludes lakes, ponds, glaciers > 1 km^{2} (0.386 sq mi or 247 acres) and river estuaries.

Brametot (French pronunciation: [bʁamto]) is a commune in the Seine-Maritime department in the Normandy region in northern France.

== Geography ==
A small farming village situated in the Pays de Caux, 20 miles (32 km) southwest of Dieppe, at the junction of the D142 and the D307 roads.

== Population ==
Historical population
Year	Pop.	±% p.a.
1968	164	—
1975	148	−1.46%
1982	141	−0.69%
1990	159	+1.51%
1999	173	+0.94%
2007	169	−0.29%
2012	156	−1.59%
2017	206	+5.72%
2023	199	−0.57%
Source: INSEE

== Places of interest ==
- The church of St. Denis, dating from the sixteenth century.
- A sixteenth-century stone cross.

== See also ==
- Communes of the Seine-Maritime department
