= Saint-Pierre-le-Viger =

- Commune
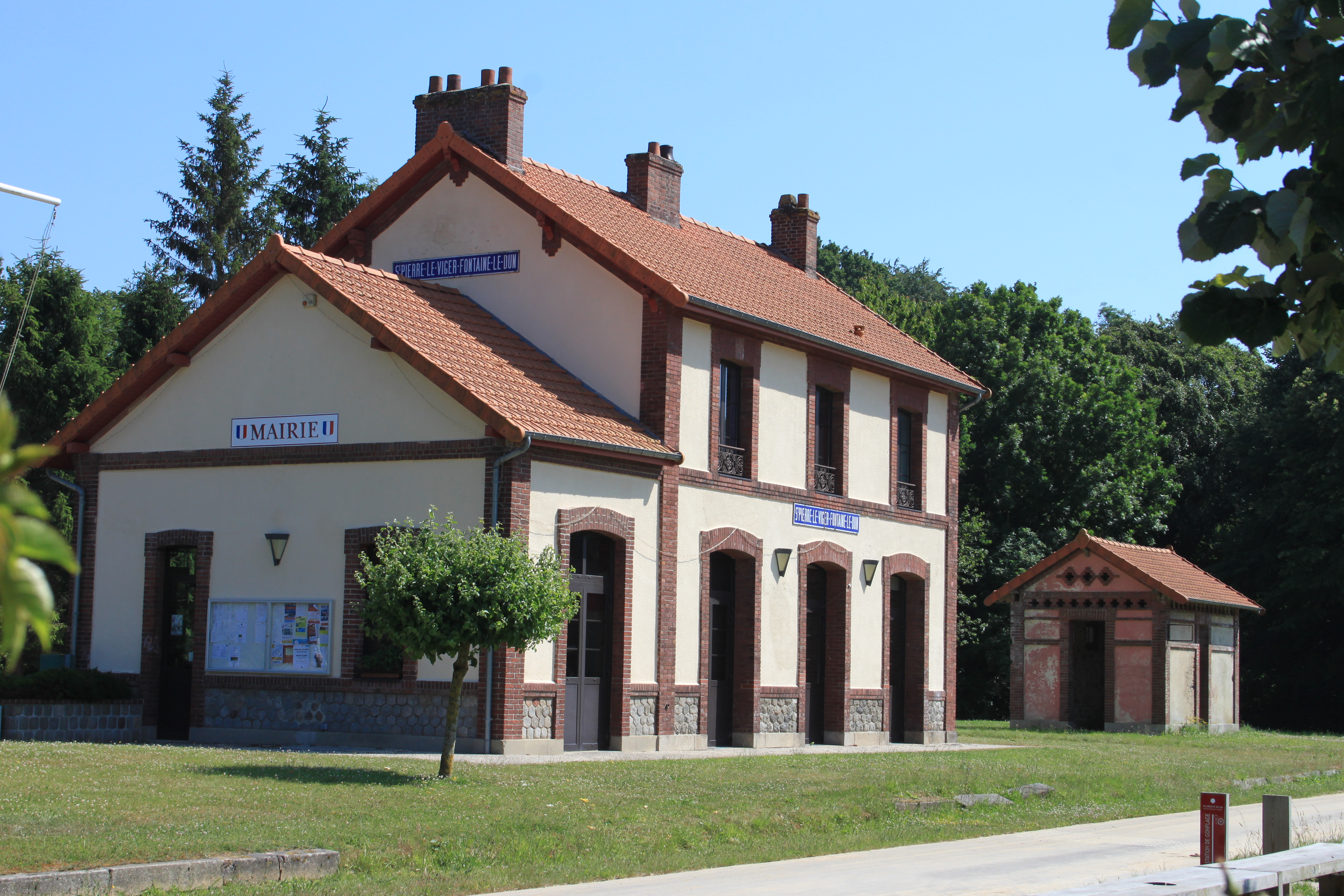
- Town hall
- Location of Saint-Pierre-le-Viger
- Location within France Location within Normandy
- Coordinates: 49°49′27″N 0°51′02″E
- Country: France
- Region: Normandy
- Department: Seine-Maritime
- Arrondissement: Dieppe
- Canton: Saint-Valery-en-Caux
- Intercommunality: CC Côte d'Albâtre

Government
  - Mayor (2026–32): Daniel Legros
- Area^{1}: 5.45 km^{2} (2.10 sq mi)
- Elevation: 40 m (130 ft)
- Highest elevation: 91 m (299 ft)
- Lowest elevation: 32 m (105 ft)
- Population (2023): 255
  - Density: 46.8/km^{2} (121/sq mi)
- Time zone: UTC+01:00 (CET)
  - Summer (DST): UTC+02:00 (CEST)
- INSEE/Postal code: 76642 /76740
- ^{1} French Land Register data, which excludes lakes, ponds, glaciers > 1 km^{2} (0.386 sq mi or 247 acres) and river estuaries.

Saint-Pierre-le-Viger is a commune in the Seine-Maritime department in the Normandy region in northern France.

== Geography ==
Hosting the farming village of the same name, the mainly agricultural commune is bisected by the north-flowing Dun. It is 12 miles (19 km) southwest of the large coastal town Dieppe in the Pays de Caux, where the D237, the D89 and the D142 roads meet.

== Meteorite find ==
The commune bore the first find of the 2023 CX1 metre-sized asteroid or meteroid's meteorites.

== Population ==
Historical population
Year	Pop.	±% p.a.
1968	314	—
1975	298	−0.74%
1982	258	−2.04%
1990	257	−0.05%
1999	274	+0.71%
2007	274	+0.00%
2012	267	−0.52%
2017	257	−0.76%
2023	255	−0.13%
Source: INSEE

== Places of interest ==
- The church of St. Joseph-Benoît Cottolengo, built in 1958, after the destruction of most of the village during 1944.
- The sixteenth century manorhouse.

== See also ==
- Communes of the Seine-Maritime department
