= Angiens =

- Commune
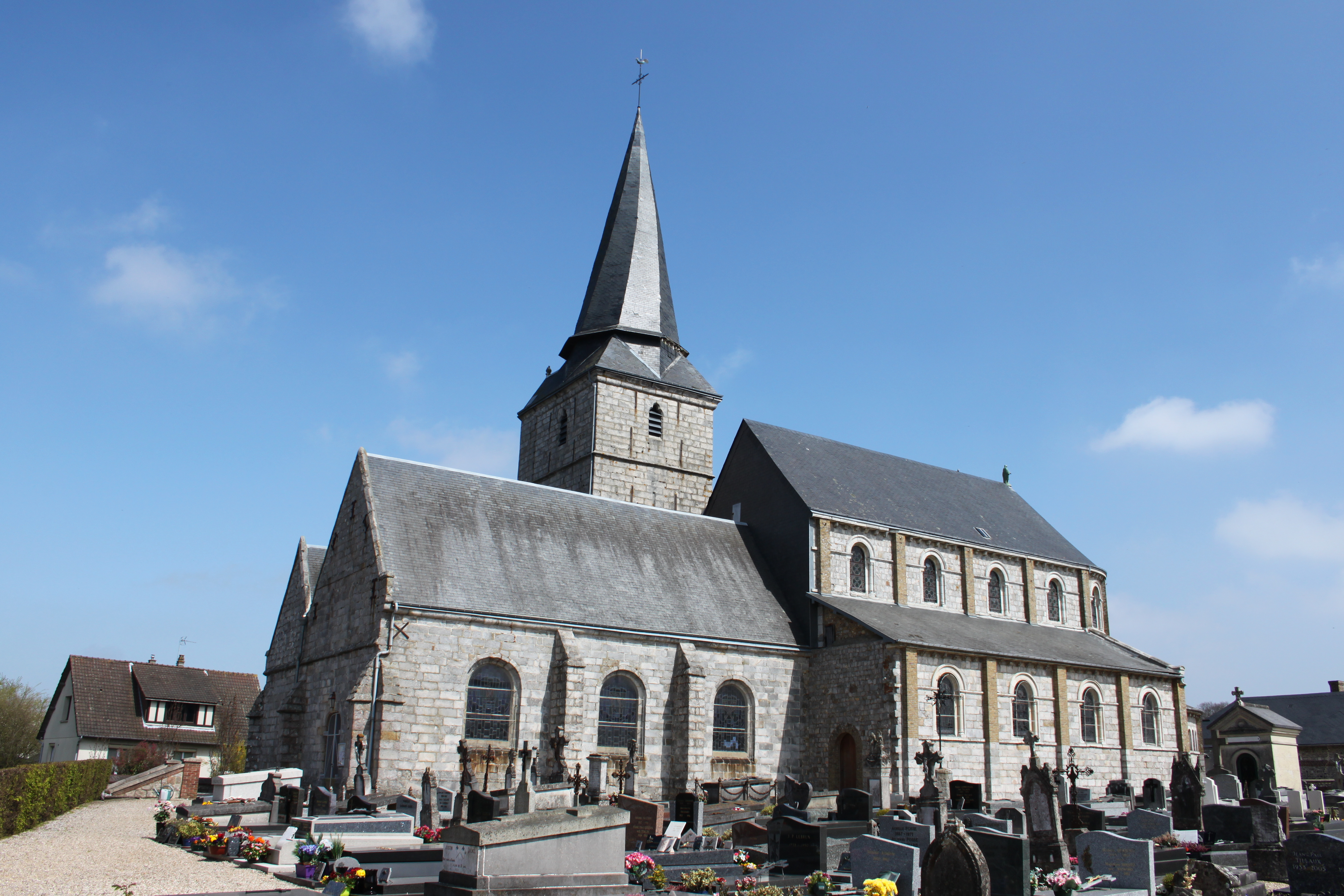
- The church in Angiens
- Location of Angiens
- Location within France Location within Normandy
- Coordinates: 49°49′46″N 0°47′28″E
- Country: France
- Region: Normandy
- Department: Seine-Maritime
- Arrondissement: Dieppe
- Canton: Saint-Valery-en-Caux
- Intercommunality: Côte d'Albâtre

Government
  - Mayor (2020–2026): Jean-Marie Ferment
- Area^{1}: 6.88 km^{2} (2.66 sq mi)
- Elevation: 87 m (285 ft)
- Highest elevation: 96 m (315 ft)
- Lowest elevation: 59 m (194 ft)
- Population (2023): 513
  - Density: 74.6/km^{2} (193/sq mi)
- Time zone: UTC+01:00 (CET)
  - Summer (DST): UTC+02:00 (CEST)
- INSEE/Postal code: 76015 /76740
- ^{1} French Land Register data, which excludes lakes, ponds, glaciers > 1 km^{2} (0.386 sq mi or 247 acres) and river estuaries.

Angiens (French pronunciation: [ɑ̃ʒjɛ̃]) is a commune in the Seine-Maritime department in the Normandy region in northern France.

== Geography ==
A farming village situated in the Pays de Caux, some 16 miles (26 km) southwest of Dieppe, at the junction of the D75, D37 and D468 roads.

== Population ==
Historical population
Year	Pop.	±% p.a.
1968	538	—
1975	522	−0.43%
1982	527	+0.14%
1990	602	+1.68%
1999	625	+0.42%
2007	603	−0.45%
2012	542	−2.11%
2017	516	−0.98%
2023	513	−0.10%
Source: INSEE

== Places of interest ==
- The church of St.Martin & St.Sébastien, dating from the twelfth century.
- The eleventh century church at Iclon.
- The château de Silleron, dating from the sixteenth century
- The manorhouse de Roquefort.
- A sandstone cross, built in 1633.
- A feudal motte.

== See also ==
- Communes of the Seine-Maritime department
