= La Gaillarde =

- Commune
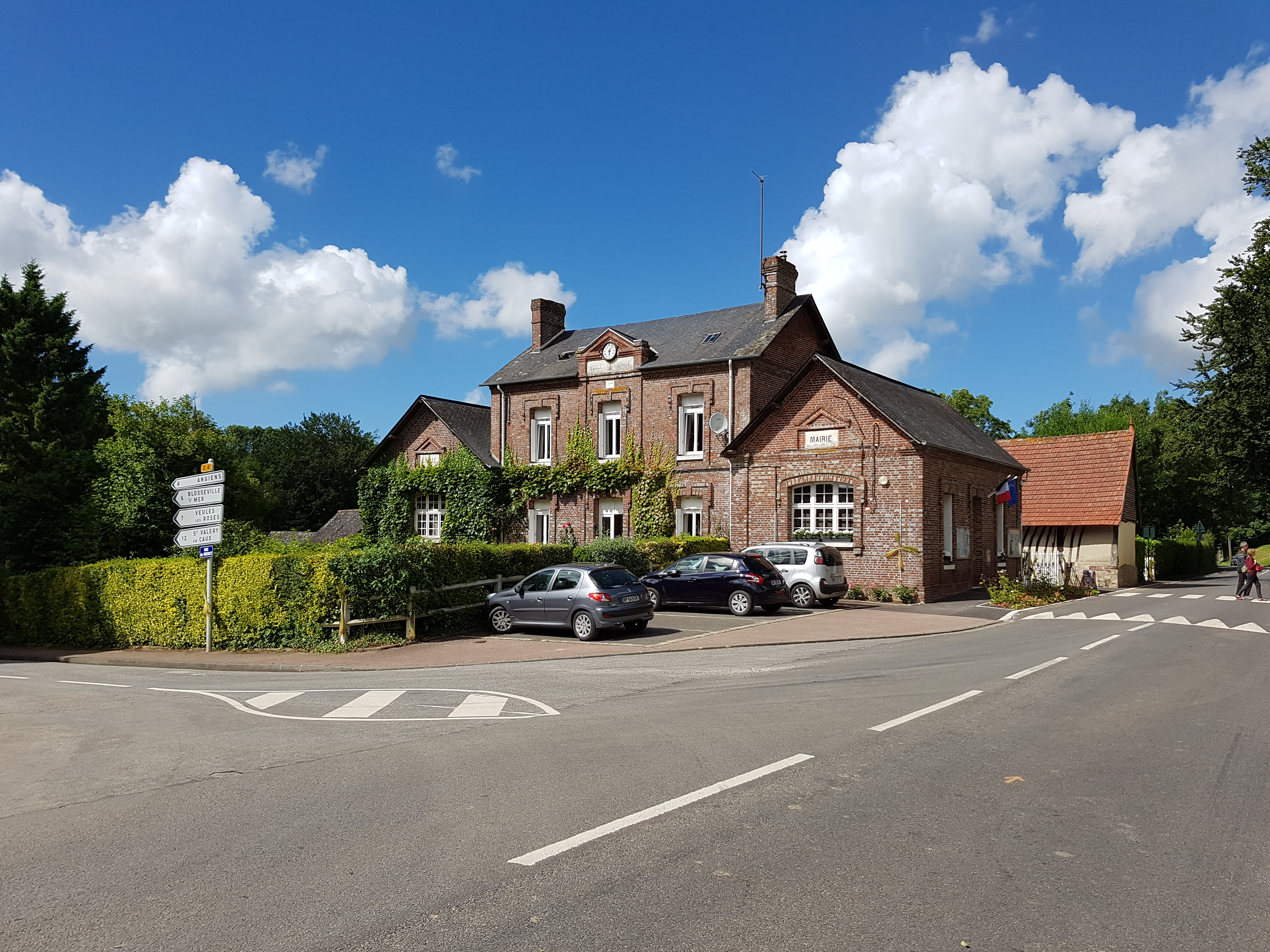
- The town hall and school in La Gaillarde
- Location of La Gaillarde
- Location within France Location within Normandy
- Coordinates: 49°50′11″N 0°51′39″E
- Country: France
- Region: Normandy
- Department: Seine-Maritime
- Arrondissement: Dieppe
- Canton: Saint-Valery-en-Caux
- Intercommunality: CC Côte d'Albâtre

Government
  - Mayor (2020–2026): Jérôme Lheureux
- Area^{1}: 7.78 km^{2} (3.00 sq mi)
- Elevation: 43 m (141 ft)
- Highest elevation: 87 m (285 ft)
- Lowest elevation: 24 m (79 ft)
- Population (2023): 373
  - Density: 47.9/km^{2} (124/sq mi)
- Time zone: UTC+01:00 (CET)
  - Summer (DST): UTC+02:00 (CEST)
- INSEE/Postal code: 76294 /76740
- ^{1} French Land Register data, which excludes lakes, ponds, glaciers > 1 km^{2} (0.386 sq mi or 247 acres) and river estuaries.

La Gaillarde (French pronunciation: [la ɡajaʁd]) is a commune situated in the Seine-Maritime department in the Normandy region in northern France.

== Geography ==
A farming village situated by the banks of the Dun river in the Pays de Caux, some 11 miles (18 km) southwest of Dieppe at the junction of the D4 and the D237 roads.

== Population ==
Historical population
Year	Pop.	±% p.a.
1968	519	—
1975	462	−1.65%
1982	378	−2.83%
1990	420	+1.33%
1999	415	−0.13%
2007	427	+0.36%
2012	391	−1.75%
2017	386	−0.26%
2023	373	−0.57%
Source: INSEE

== Places of interest ==
- Two 16th-century stone crosses.
- A recently restored 11th-century chapel.
- The church of Notre-Dame, dating from the twelfth century.

== See also ==
- Communes of the Seine-Maritime department
