= Sotteville-sur-Mer =

- Commune
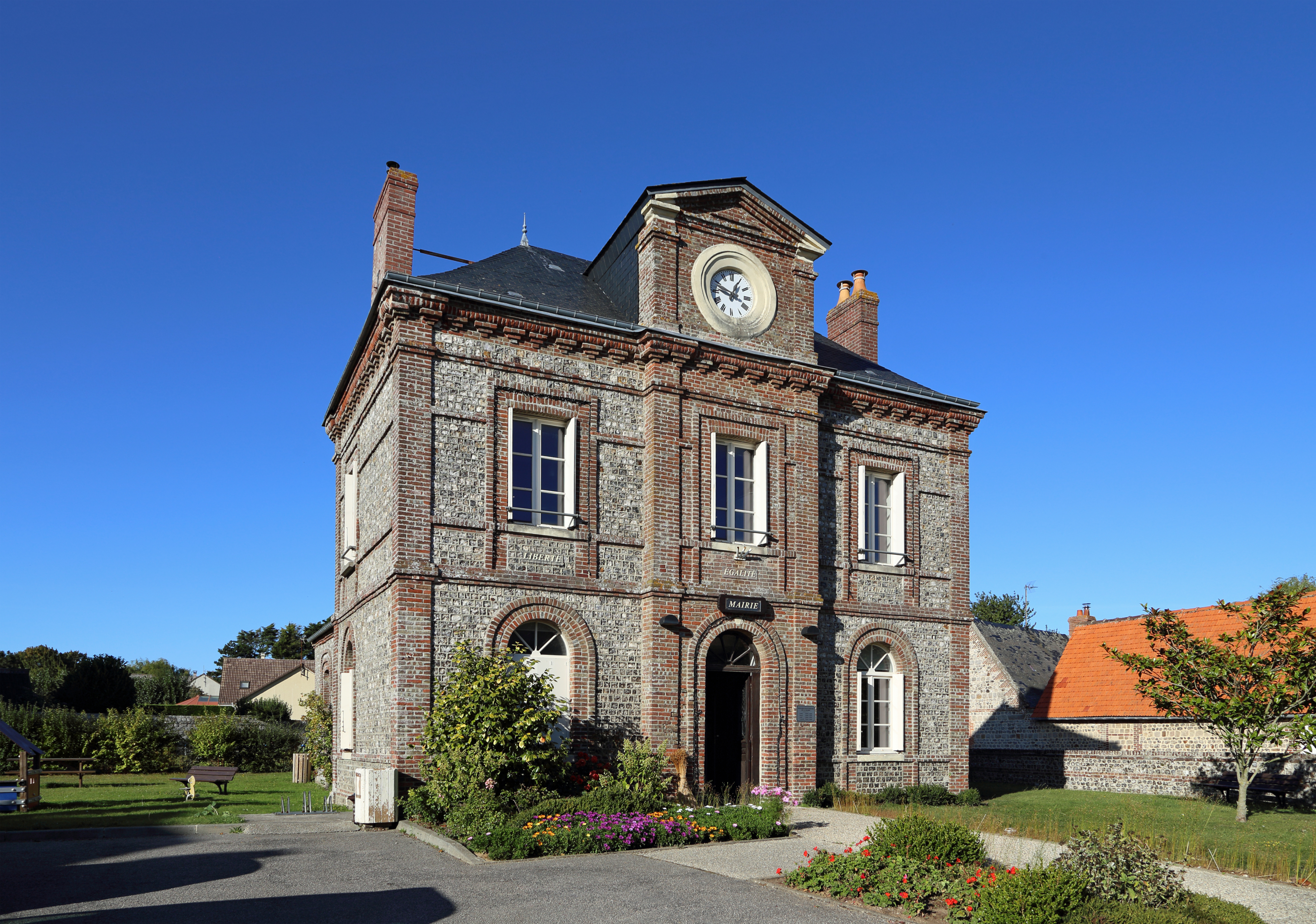
- Town hall of Sotteville-sur-Mer

- Coat of arms
- Location of Sotteville-sur-Mer
- Location within France Location within Normandy
- Coordinates: 49°52′56″N 0°49′52″E
- Country: France
- Region: Normandy
- Department: Seine-Maritime
- Arrondissement: Dieppe
- Canton: Saint-Valery-en-Caux
- Intercommunality: CC Côte d'Albâtre

Government
  - Mayor (2026–32): Marie-Hélène Changarnier
- Area^{1}: 8.09 km^{2} (3.12 sq mi)
- Elevation: 40 m (130 ft)
- Highest elevation: 69 m (226 ft)
- Lowest elevation: 0 m (0 ft)
- Population (2023): 392
  - Density: 48.5/km^{2} (125/sq mi)
- Time zone: UTC+01:00 (CET)
  - Summer (DST): UTC+02:00 (CEST)
- INSEE/Postal code: 76683 /76740
- ^{1} French Land Register data, which excludes lakes, ponds, glaciers > 1 km^{2} (0.386 sq mi or 247 acres) and river estuaries.

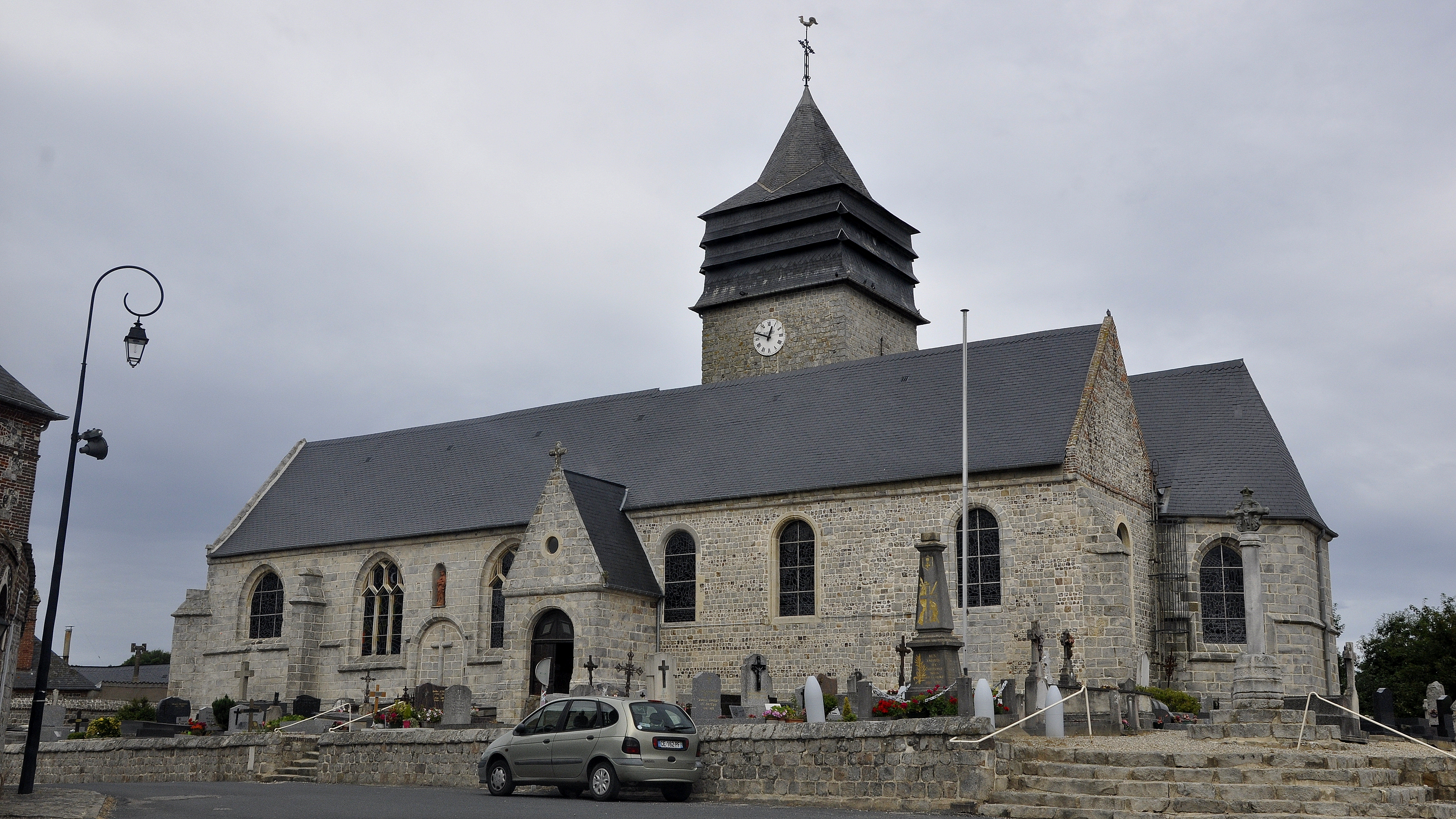
Notre-Dame church

Sotteville-sur-Mer (French pronunciation: [sɔtvil syʁ mɛʁ], literally Sotteville on Sea) is a commune in the Seine-Maritime department in the Normandy region in north-western France.

== Geography ==
A farming village situated in the Pays de Caux, some 11 miles (18 km) southwest of Dieppe, at the junction of the D68 and D89 roads. Here, huge chalk cliffs rise up from a pebble beach to overlook the English Channel. Access to the beach is by 231 steps cut out of the cliffs.

== Heraldry ==
Arms of Sotteville-sur-Mer	The arms of Sotteville-sur-Mer are blazoned : Or, a lion per fess azure and gules, armed and langued counterchanged.

== Population ==
Historical population
Year	Pop.	±% p.a.
1968	324	—
1975	318	−0.27%
1982	313	−0.23%
1990	365	+1.94%
1999	388	+0.68%
2007	359	−0.97%
2012	355	−0.22%
2017	390	+1.90%
2023	392	+0.09%
Source: INSEE

== Places of interest ==
- The church of Notre-Dame, dating from the thirteenth century.
- The chapel of Notre-Dame-du-Val, dating from the tenth century.

== See also ==
- Communes of the Seine-Maritime department
