= Fontaine-le-Dun =

- Commune
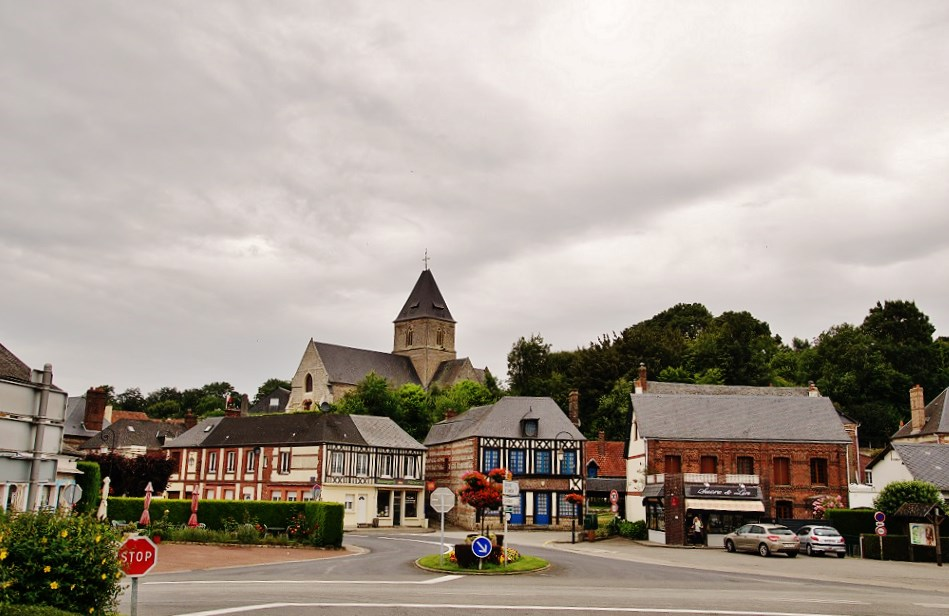
- The centre of Fontaine-le-Dun

- Coat of arms
- Location of Fontaine-le-Dun
- Location within France Location within Normandy
- Coordinates: 49°48′50″N 0°51′03″E
- Country: France
- Region: Normandy
- Department: Seine-Maritime
- Arrondissement: Dieppe
- Canton: Saint-Valery-en-Caux
- Intercommunality: CC Côte d'Albâtre

Government
  - Mayor (2020–2026): Philippe Etienne
- Area^{1}: 5.35 km^{2} (2.07 sq mi)
- Elevation: 60 m (200 ft)
- Highest elevation: 100 m (330 ft)
- Lowest elevation: 44 m (144 ft)
- Population (2023): 873
  - Density: 163/km^{2} (423/sq mi)
- Time zone: UTC+01:00 (CET)
  - Summer (DST): UTC+02:00 (CEST)
- INSEE/Postal code: 76272 /76740
- ^{1} French Land Register data, which excludes lakes, ponds, glaciers > 1 km^{2} (0.386 sq mi or 247 acres) and river estuaries.

Fontaine-le-Dun (French pronunciation: [fɔ̃tɛn lə dœ̃]) is a commune in the Seine-Maritime department in the Normandy region in northern France.

== Geography ==
Fontaine-le-Dun is a small farming town, with associated light industry, situated by the banks of the river Dun in the Pays de Caux, some 15 miles (24 km) southwest of Dieppe, at the junction of the D142 and the D79 roads.

== Heraldry ==
Arms of Fontaine-le-Dun	The arms of Fontaine-le-Dun are blazoned : Azure, a sword between 2 crescents argent above both a lance head Or, and on a chief gules, a cross argent.

== Population ==
Historical population
Year	Pop.	±% p.a.
1968	607	—
1975	641	+0.78%
1982	796	+3.14%
1990	962	+2.40%
1999	978	+0.18%
2007	947	−0.40%
2012	838	−2.42%
2017	903	+1.51%
2023	873	−0.56%
Source: INSEE

== Places of interest ==
- The eleventh-century church of Notre-Dame
- A sixteenth-century stone cross
- A manorhouse dating from the seventeenth century

== Notable people ==
Pierre Giffard, journalist, was born here in 1853.

== See also ==
- Communes of the Seine-Maritime department
