= Saint-Aubin-sur-Mer, Seine-Maritime =

Saint-Aubin-sur-Mer
- Commune
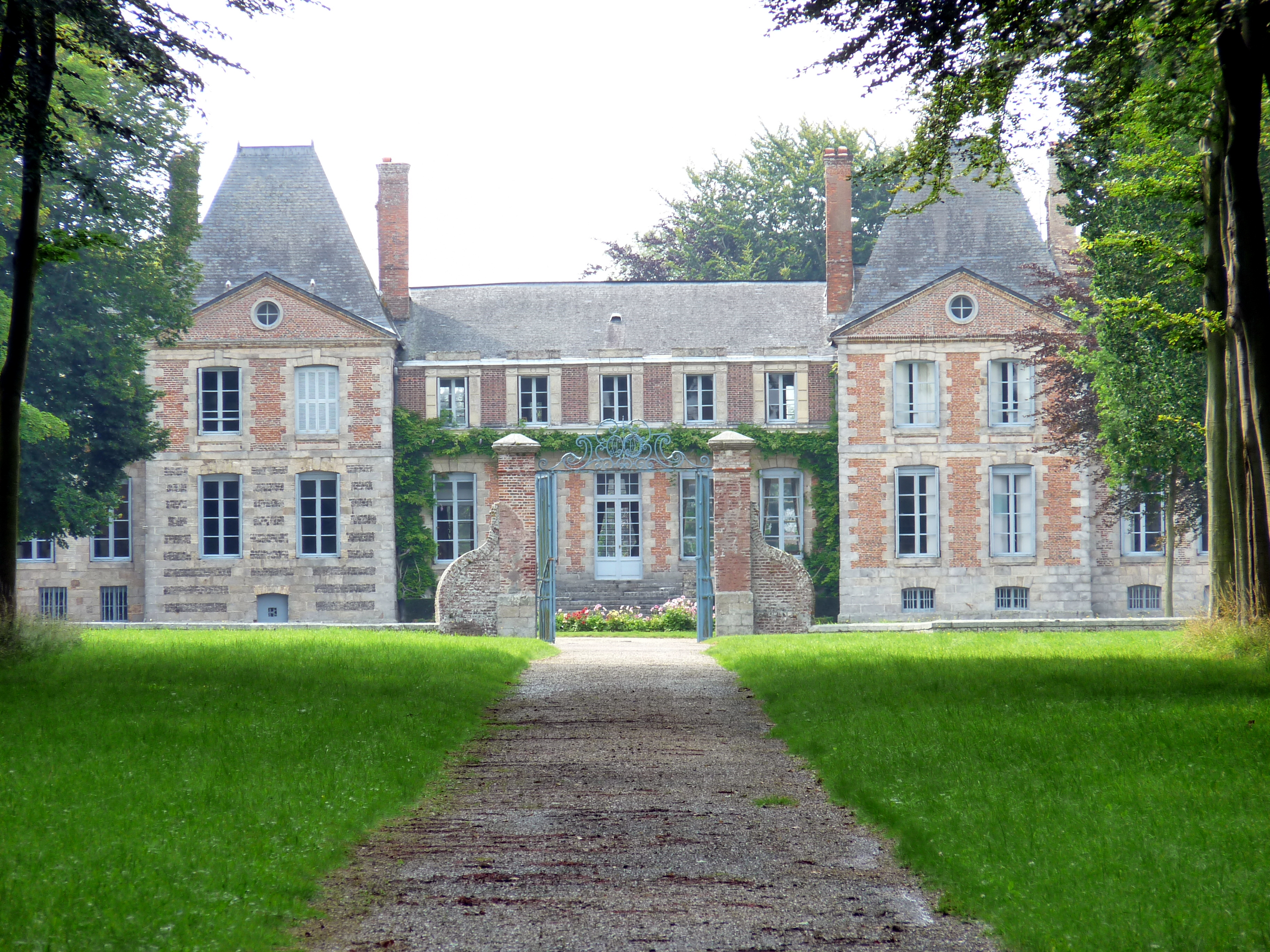
- The chateau in Saint-Aubin-sur-Mer

- Coat of arms
- Location of Saint-Aubin-sur-Mer
- Location within France Location within Normandy
- Coordinates: 49°53′24″N 0°52′32″E
- Country: France
- Region: Normandy
- Department: Seine-Maritime
- Arrondissement: Dieppe
- Canton: Saint-Valery-en-Caux
- Intercommunality: CC Côte d'Albâtre

Government
  - Mayor (2026–32): Jean-Michel Grange
- Area^{1}: 6.21 km^{2} (2.40 sq mi)
- Elevation: 20 m (66 ft)
- Highest elevation: 54 m (177 ft)
- Lowest elevation: 0 m (0 ft)
- Population (2023): 181
  - Density: 29.1/km^{2} (75.5/sq mi)
- Time zone: UTC+01:00 (CET)
  - Summer (DST): UTC+02:00 (CEST)
- INSEE/Postal code: 76564 /76740
- ^{1} French Land Register data, which excludes lakes, ponds, glaciers > 1 km^{2} (0.386 sq mi or 247 acres) and river estuaries.

Saint-Aubin-sur-Mer (French pronunciation: [sɛ̃.t‿obɛ̃ syʁ mɛʁ], literally Saint-Aubin on Sea) is a commune in the Seine-Maritime department in the Normandy region in northern France.

== Geography ==
A village of farming and tourism situated in the Pays de Caux, at the junction of the D75, D68 and the D237 roads, some 13 miles (21 km) southwest of Dieppe. Here, huge chalk cliffs overlook a pebble beach and the English Channel.

== Population ==
Historical population
Year	Pop.	±% p.a.
1968	264	—
1975	235	−1.65%
1982	280	+2.53%
1990	281	+0.04%
1999	280	−0.04%
2007	265	−0.69%
2012	220	−3.65%
2017	170	−5.03%
2023	181	+1.05%
Source: INSEE

== Places of interest ==
- A Louis XIII style château, built on the old castle, with a dovecote and park.
- A seventeenth-century fortified manorhouse.
- Vestiges of the Atlantic Wall.
- The church of St. Aubin, dating from the twelfth century.

== See also ==
- Communes of the Seine-Maritime department
