= Autigny, Seine-Maritime =

Autigny
- Commune
- Location of Autigny
- Location within France Location within Normandy
- Coordinates: 49°47′44″N 0°51′39″E
- Country: France
- Region: Normandy
- Department: Seine-Maritime
- Arrondissement: Dieppe
- Canton: Saint-Valery-en-Caux
- Intercommunality: CC Côte Albâtre

Government
  - Mayor (2026–32): Valérie Morsalinne
- Area^{1}: 4.1 km^{2} (1.6 sq mi)
- Elevation: 100 m (330 ft)
- Highest elevation: 114 m (374 ft)
- Lowest elevation: 54 m (177 ft)
- Population (2023): 321
  - Density: 78/km^{2} (200/sq mi)
- Time zone: UTC+01:00 (CET)
  - Summer (DST): UTC+02:00 (CEST)
- INSEE/Postal code: 76040 /76740
- ^{1} French Land Register data, which excludes lakes, ponds, glaciers > 1 km^{2} (0.386 sq mi or 247 acres) and river estuaries.

Autigny (French pronunciation: [otiɲi]) is a commune in the Seine-Maritime department in the Normandy region in northern France.

== Geography ==
A small farming village situated in the Pays de Caux, some 26 miles (42 km) southwest of Dieppe at the junction of the D108 and D142 roads.

== Population ==
Historical population
Year	Pop.	±% p.a.
1968	134	—
1975	112	−2.53%
1982	118	+0.75%
1990	120	+0.21%
1999	224	+7.18%
2007	255	+1.63%
2012	295	+2.96%
2017	313	+1.19%
2023	321	+0.42%
Source: INSEE

== Places of interest ==
- The seventeenth-century church of St Martin.

== See also ==
- Communes of the Seine-Maritime department
