= Canton of Offranville =

Coordinates: 49°52′35″N 1°01′28″E

Offranville
- Former canton
- Interactive map of Offranville
- Country: France
- Region: Normandy
- Department: Seine-Maritime
- No. of communes: {{{nbcomm}}}
- Disbanded: 2015
- Area: 135.87 km^{2} (52.46 sq mi)
- Population (2012): 17,886
  - Density: 131.64/km^{2} (340.95/sq mi)

The Canton of Offranville is a former canton situated in the Seine-Maritime département and in the Haute-Normandie region of northern France. It was disbanded following the French canton reorganisation which came into effect in March 2015. It had a total of 17,886 inhabitants (2012).

== Geography ==
An area of farming and light industry in the arrondissement of Dieppe, centred on the town of Offranville. The altitude varies from 0m (Hautot-sur-Mer) to 129m (Arques-la-Bataille) for an average altitude of 73m.

The canton comprised 18 communes:

- Ambrumesnil
- Arques-la-Bataille
- Aubermesnil-Beaumais
- Le Bourg-Dun
- Colmesnil-Manneville
- Hautot-sur-Mer
- Longueil
- Martigny
- Offranville
- Ouville-la-Rivière
- Quiberville
- Rouxmesnil-Bouteilles
- Saint-Aubin-sur-Scie
- Saint-Denis-d'Aclon
- Sainte-Marguerite-sur-Mer
- Sauqueville
- Tourville-sur-Arques
- Varengeville-sur-Mer

== Population ==
Historical population Canton of Offranville
Year	1962	1968	1975	1982	1990	1999
Pop.	13,272	13,848	14,550	16,105	17,170	17,936
±%	—	+4.3%	+5.1%	+10.7%	+6.6%	+4.5%
From the year 1962 on: No double counting – residents of multiple communes (e.g. students and military personnel) are counted only once. Source: INSEE

== See also ==
- Arrondissements of the Seine-Maritime department
- Cantons of the Seine-Maritime department
- Communes of the Seine-Maritime department
