= Martin-Église =

- Commune
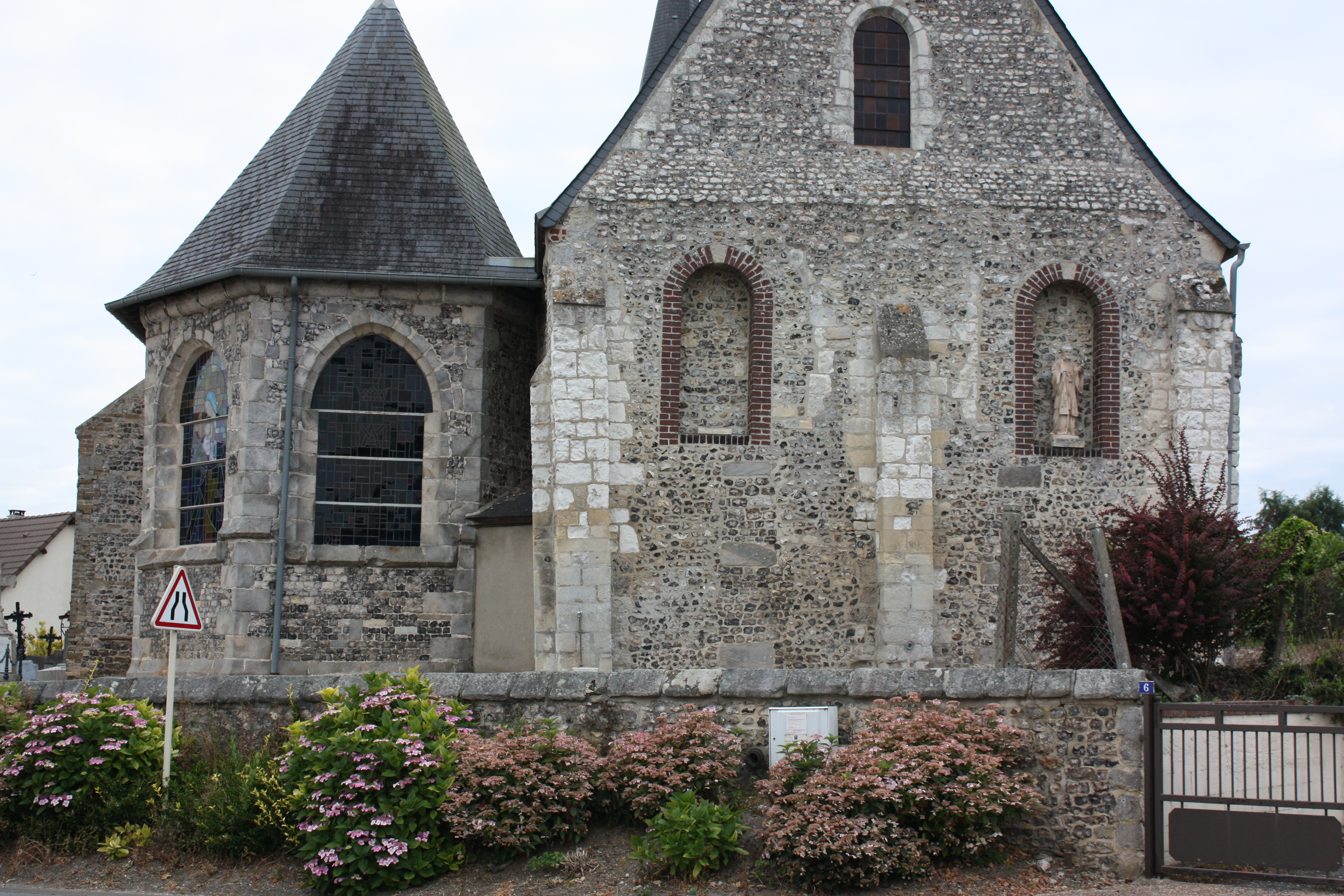
- The church in Martin-Église

- Coat of arms
- Location of Martin-Église
- Location within France Location within Normandy
- Coordinates: 49°54′08″N 1°08′29″E
- Country: France
- Region: Normandy
- Department: Seine-Maritime
- Arrondissement: Dieppe
- Canton: Dieppe-2
- Intercommunality: CA Région Dieppoise

Government
  - Mayor (2026–32): Stephane Skladanowski
- Area^{1}: 9.58 km^{2} (3.70 sq mi)
- Elevation: 11 m (36 ft)
- Highest elevation: 103 m (338 ft)
- Lowest elevation: 2 m (6.6 ft)
- Population (2023): 1,589
  - Density: 166/km^{2} (430/sq mi)
- Time zone: UTC+01:00 (CET)
  - Summer (DST): UTC+02:00 (CEST)
- INSEE/Postal code: 76414 /76370
- ^{1} French Land Register data, which excludes lakes, ponds, glaciers > 1 km^{2} (0.386 sq mi or 247 acres) and river estuaries.

Martin-Église (French pronunciation: [maʁtɛ̃ eɡliz]) is a commune in the Seine-Maritime department in the Normandy region in northern France.

== Geography ==
A village of light industry and farming situated by the banks of the river Arques in the Pays de Caux, immediately to the southeast of Dieppe, at the junction of the D1, the D54 and the D100 roads.

== Heraldry ==
Arms of Martin-Église	The arms of Martin-Église are blazoned : Per chevron and per pale Or and azure, a chevron counterchanged between 3 lanceheads inverted counterchanged sable and argent.

== Population ==
Historical population
Year	Pop.	±% p.a.
1968	942	—
1975	1,093	+2.15%
1982	1,185	+1.16%
1990	1,167	−0.19%
1999	1,331	+1.47%
2007	1,477	+1.31%
2012	1,527	+0.67%
2017	1,587	+0.77%
2023	1,589	+0.02%
Source: INSEE

== Places of interest ==
- An obelisk commemorating the battle of Arques, inaugurated in 1827 by the Duchesse de Berry.
- The eighteenth-century château de Thibermont.
- The church of St.Martin, dating from the twelfth century.
- The sixteenth-century stone cross.
- A fourteenth-century bridge.
- The British War Cemetery in nearby Arques-la-Bataille.
- Some ancient ruins at Chateau d'Arques-la-Bataille in nearby Dieppe.

== See also ==
- Communes of the Seine-Maritime department
