= Portrait of Père Paul =

1882 painting by Claude Monet

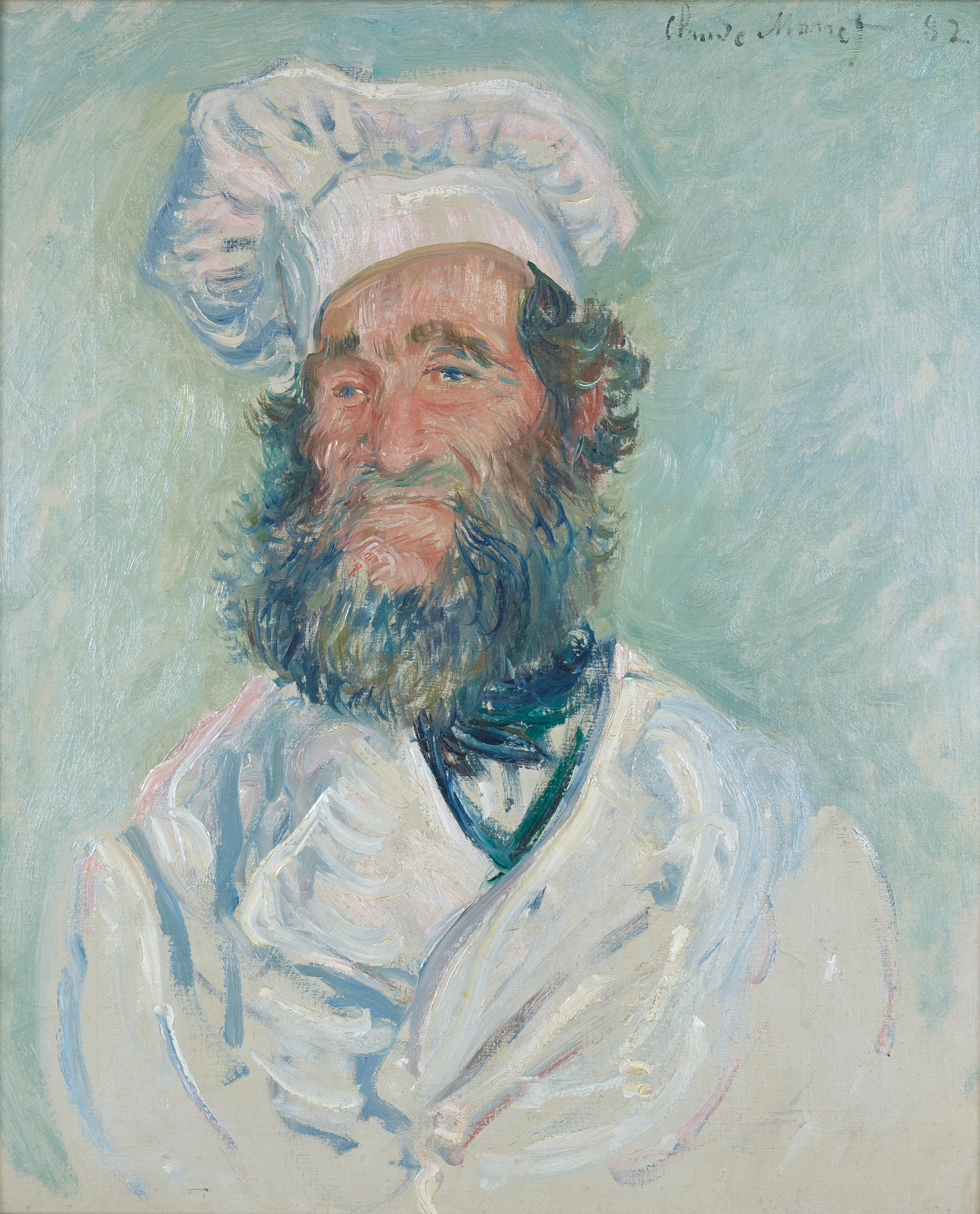
- Artist: Claude Monet
- Year: 1882
- Medium: Oil on canvas
- Dimensions: 64.5 cm × 52.1 cm (25.4 in × 20.5 in)
- Location: Österreichische Galerie Belvedere; Vienna

Portrait of Père Paul, also known as Monsieur Paul or The Chef (French: Le Père Paul), is a painting by Claude Monet.

He painted it in 1882 in oil on canvas with a height of 64.5 cm and a width of 52.1 cm. It shows the chef and owner of a restaurant and hotel Paul Antoine Graff, who was the landlord of Monet during his visit to Pourville on the English Channel.

It is part of the collections exhibited at Österreichische Galerie Belvedere in Vienna, Austria.

== Description ==
Monet painted a portrait of the chef Paul Antoine Graff wearing his white chef's hat and jacket. In the lower part of the painting, the figure fades into the light grey background, resulting in an oval shaped composition. Monsieur Paul has turned his head towards his right shoulder and looks into the direction of the left edge of the painting. His dark eyes do not focus on anything specific, and he appears to look just ahead of himself into the emptiness. His scrubby grey and black full beard is part of his appearance and nearly covers the protruding chin and the mouth with closed lips. The furrowed face was painted by Monet with strong strokes of his paintbrush, and the nose was emphasised by a more pronounced shade of the same colours. The art critic Melissa MacQuillan sees in his face his pride and the firmness of his character.

Monet described the painting as a esquisse curieuse (curious sketch). Monet created a painting full of liveliness by the tilted hat, the scrubby beard and the characteristic facial features. He used a clever colour scheme, in which the dark beard builds a contrast to the white clothes and in which the reddish and brown skin colour is complementary to the light blueish grey shades of the background. The painting is clearly signed with "Claude Monet 82" in the top right corner.

== Portrait of a host ==
Monet arrived at Pourville on 15 February 1882 and painted the landscape of the Normandy coast during the subsequent couple of months. He lived there at the Hotel A la Renommée des Galettes, which was affiliated to a restaurant. The owner was the Alsatian chef Paul Antoine Graff (1823–1893), locally known as Le Père Paul, whose special dish was galettes, i.e. Breton crusty cakes. This reputation was reflected in the name of the hotel. On a later occasion, these puff pastry cakes were also featured in Monet's still life Les Galettes (private collection).

On the day of his arrival he described in a letter to his companion/housekeeper Alice Hoschedé his regret that he hadn't come earlier to Pourville. He described Père Paul as an excellent chef and was pleased with his accommodation: "The landscape is very beautiful … one couldn't be nearer to the sea, as I am now, directly on the beach, the waves reach up to the basement of our house." Apart from the portrait of Monsieur Graff Monet also painted a portrait of Madame Graff. The painting La Mère Paul (Fogg Art Museum, Cambridge, Massachusetts) shows Madame Graff in dark clothes joined by her loyal terrier Follette. Both paintings of the Graff couple were probably created as Monet's recognition of their hospitality.

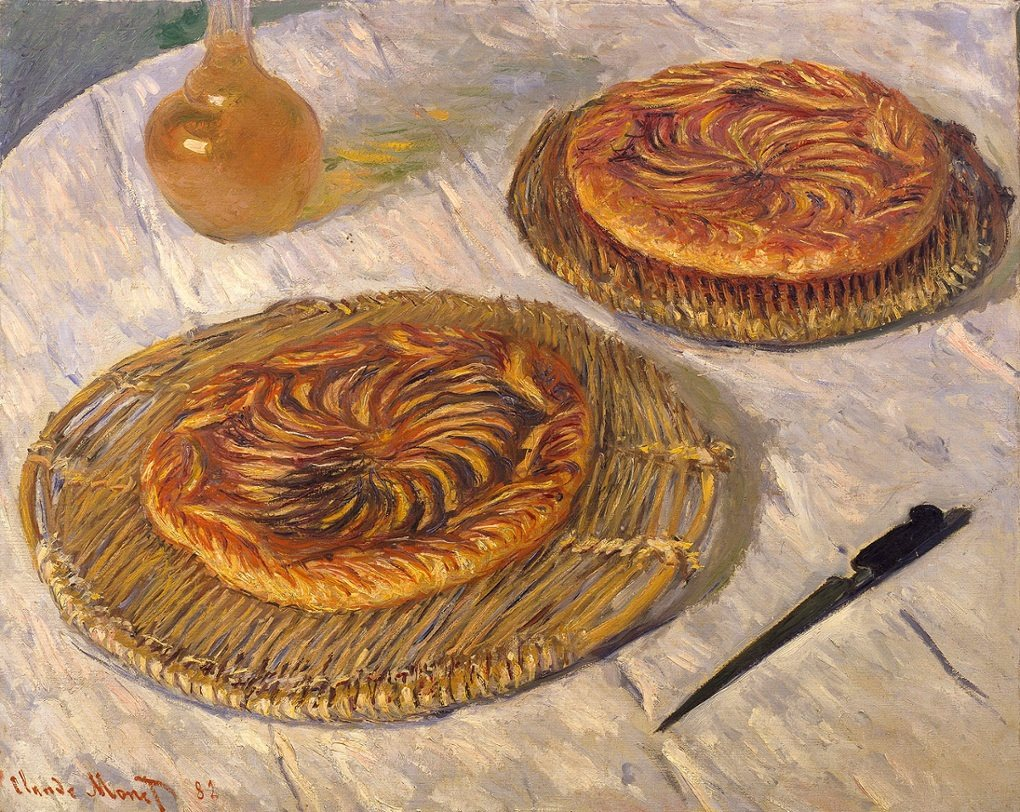
Claude Monet:
Les Galettes, 1882

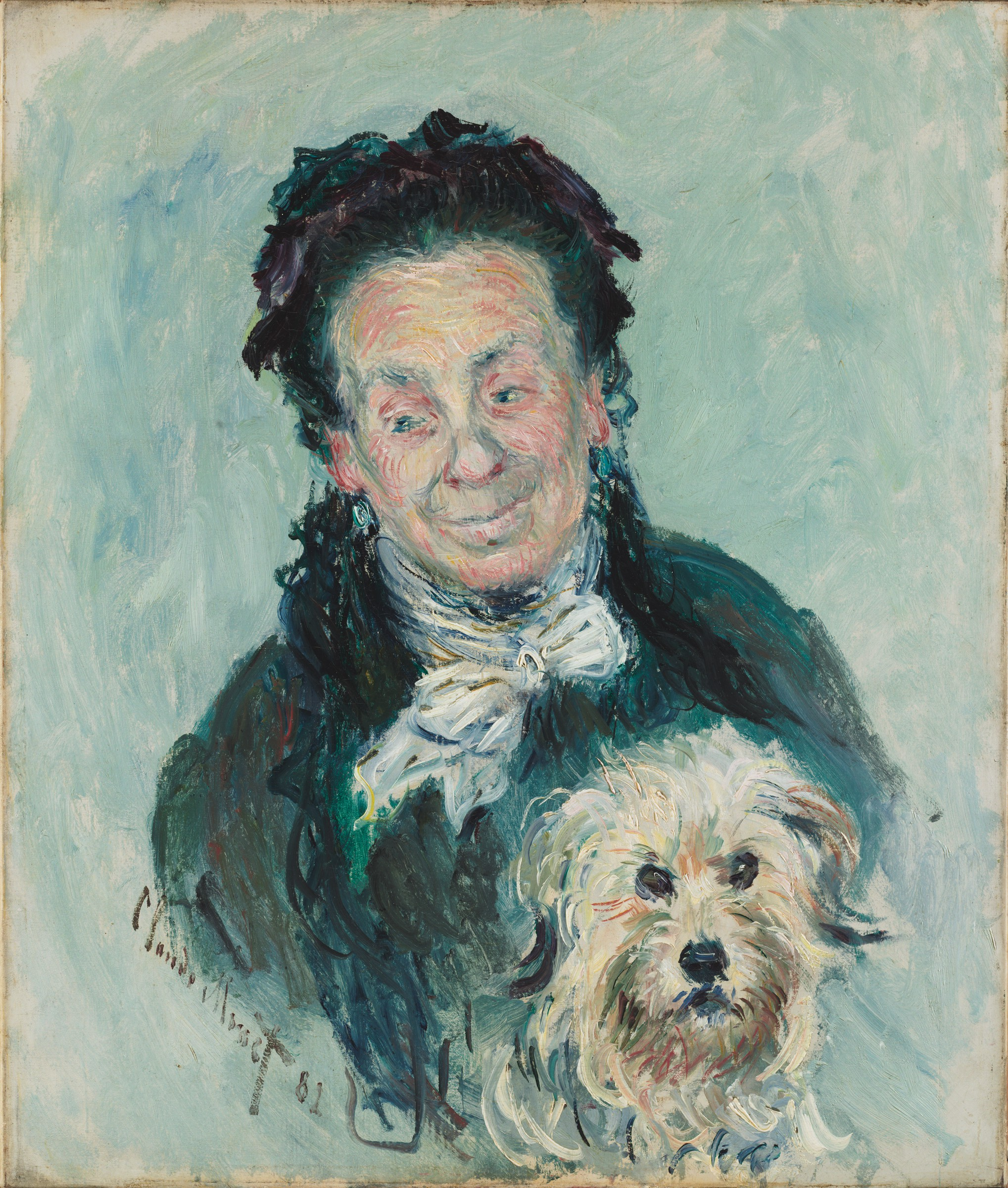
Claude Monet:
La Mère Paul, 1882

Portrait of Père Paul and La Mère Paul are two of the few portraits that Monet painted after the death of his first wife Camille in 1879. Other paintings are those of his son Michel Monet Wearing a Bobble Hat in 1880 and his self-portraits of 1886 and 1917. Apart from paintings of the Graffs and his own family, Monet also painted a portrait of the fisherman Poly (Musée Marmottan Monet, Paris) in 1886. The fisherman Poly with his full beard and the characteristic facial features shows some resemblance to Père Paul as shown in the Portrait of Père Paul. Melissa MacQuillan noted in the Graff portrait and in the painting of Poly a nearly physiognomic exaggeration, which reminds one of his early works as a caricaturist in his youth. The art critic Richard R. Brettell also draws a comparison between the Portrait of Père Paul and the ironic drawings of Monet's adolescence. Several of these caricatures exist from the late 1850s, for instance the painting Mario Uchard (Art Institute of Chicago).

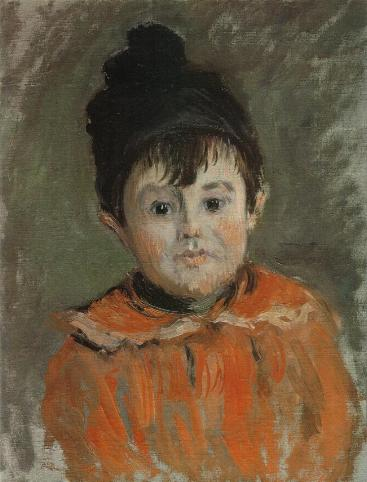
Claude Monet:
Michel Monet Wearing a Bobble Hat, 1880

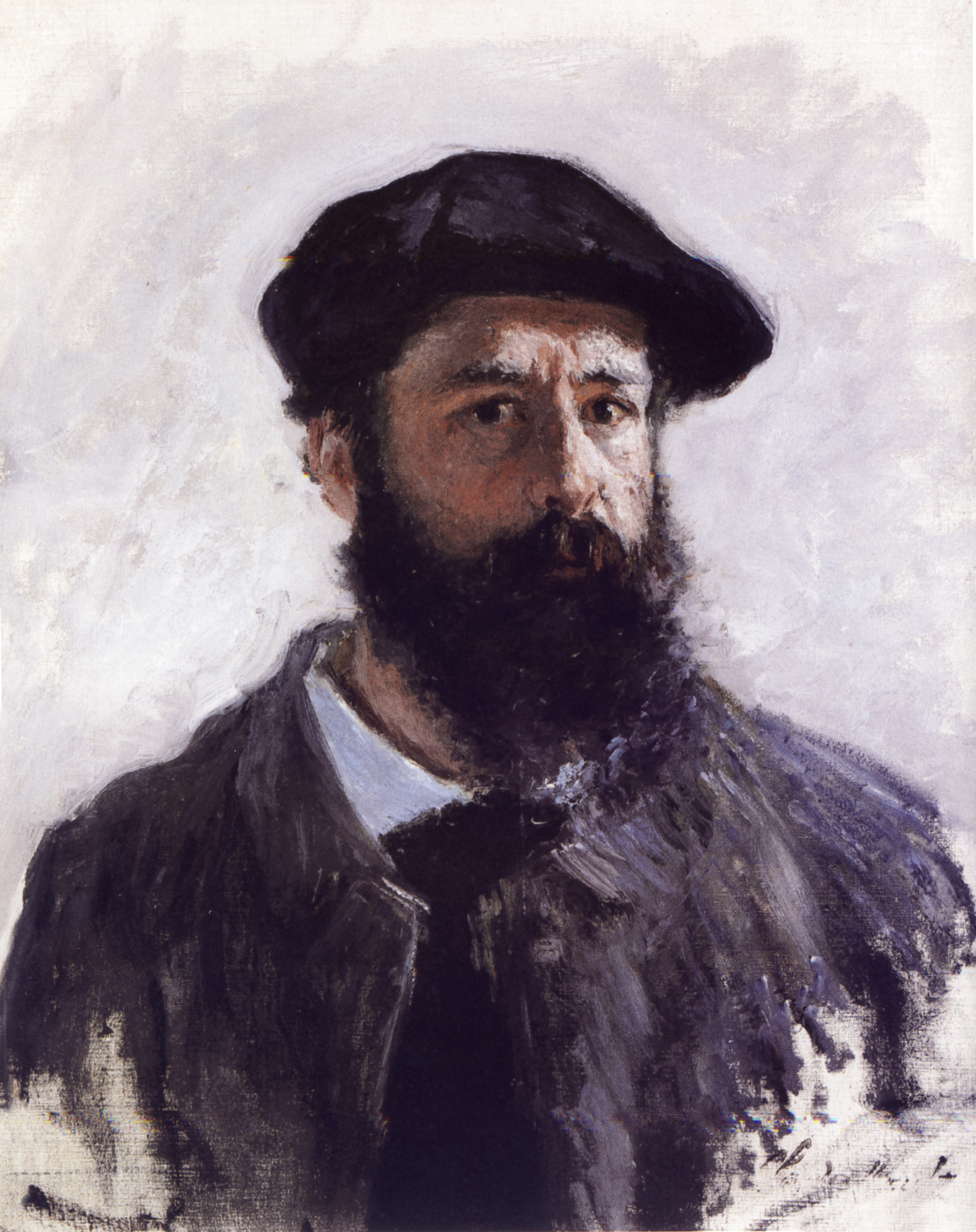
Claude Monet:
Self-portrait, 1886

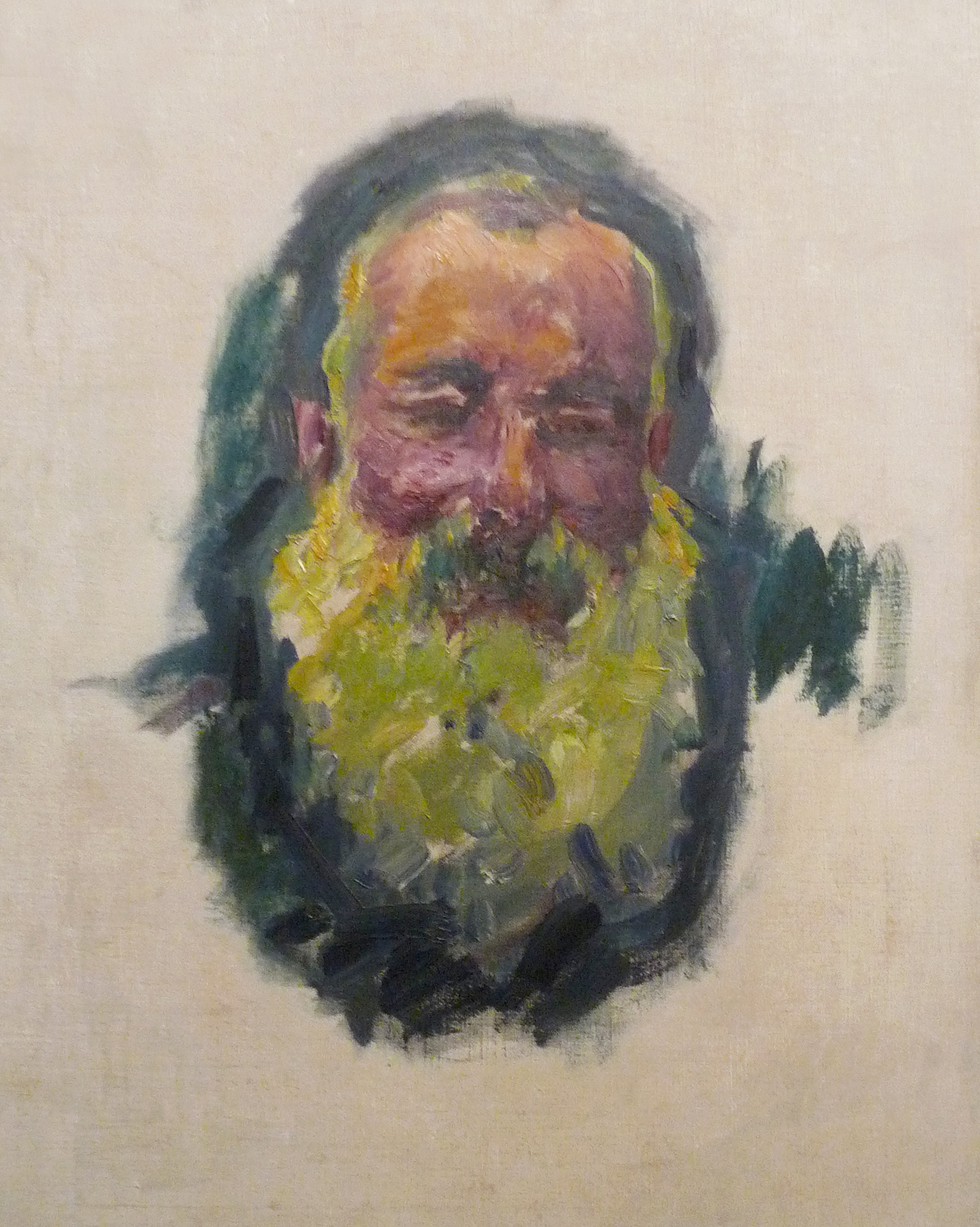
Claude Monet:
Self-portrait, 1917

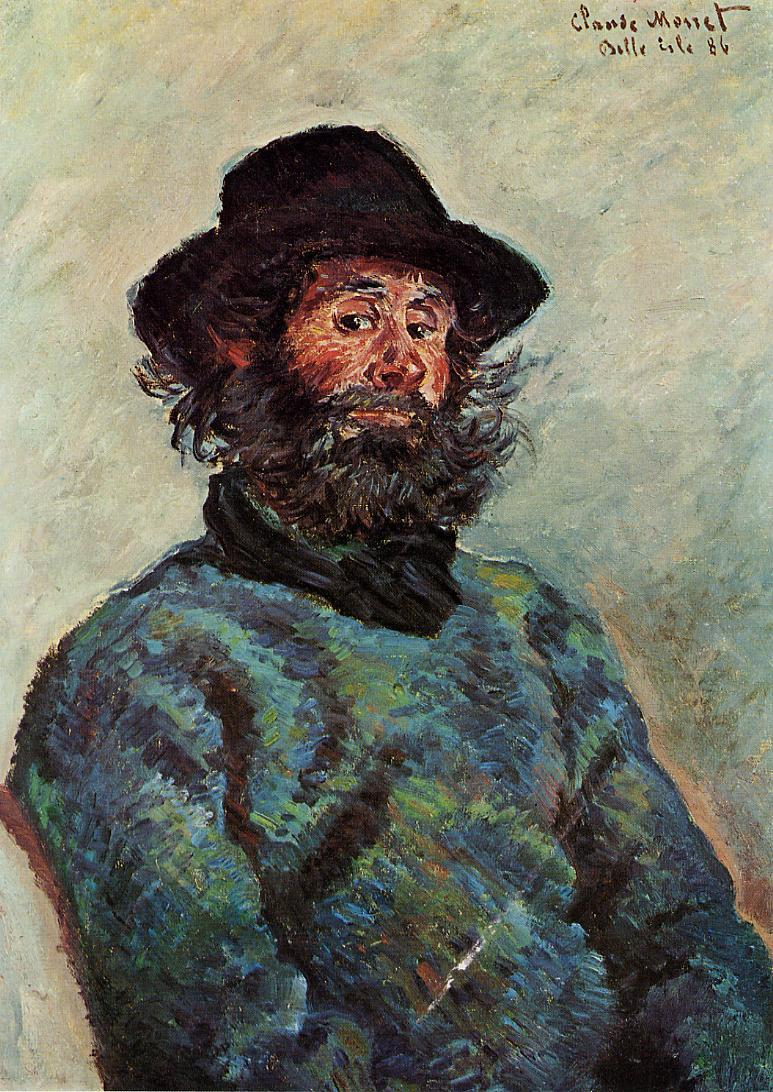
Claude Monet:
Poly, 1886

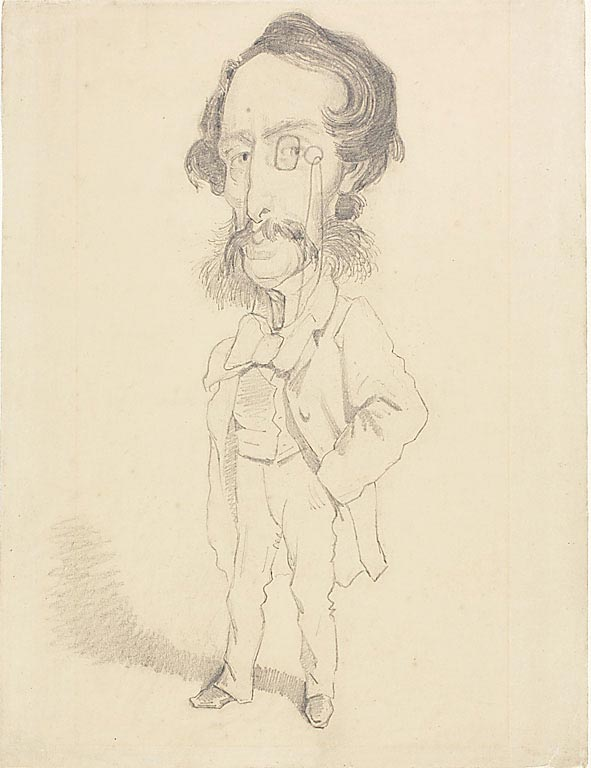
Claude Monet:
Mario Uchard, 1858

== Provenance ==
The Portrait of Père Paul was a gift from Monet to Paul Antoine Graff. After Graff's death it came in 1899 via the Paris branch of the art dealer Knoedler into the possession of the gallerist Paul Durand-Ruel. He lent the painting in 1903 to the exhibition Development of the Impressionism in Painting and Sculpture of the Vienna Secession, at which also its pendant Madame Paul was shown.

Subsequently the Portrait of Père Paul was acquired by the Moderne Galerie, the predecessor of today's Österreichische Galerie Belvedere.

== See also ==
- List of paintings by Claude Monet
