= The Rocks at Pourville, Low Tide =

1882 painting by Claude Monet

The Rocks at Pourville, Low Tide (1882)
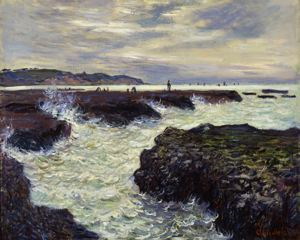
- Artist: Claude Monet
- Year: French, 1840-1926
- Medium: Oil on canvas
- Movement: Impressionism
- Dimensions: 25 5/16 x 31 in. (64.3 x 78.7 cm)
- Owner: Memorial Art Gallery of the University of Rochester, Gift of Emily Sibley Watson, accession number 39.22

The Rocks at Pourville, Low Tide (1882) was conceived when Claude Monet had his tourism at Pourville, a town on the Normandy coast near Dieppe. He stayed there for seven weeks with a series of creations from early February 1882. This work illustrates a seascape that captures the beauty of nature, showing the intersection of land and sea tranquility and dynamics. This artwork centers on the interaction between jagged coastal rocks and the sea, with the angular irregularity of the rocks in the foreground emphasizing the cragginess of the shoreline, contrasting with the dark colors and white foam of the broken waves.

This work was nowadays collected at the Memorial Art Gallery in Rochester, NY, as a gift of Emily Sibley Watson, and there is detailed information about description and exhibition lists related to this artwork as MAG artwork 4989.

== Description ==
In The Rocks at Pourville, Low Tide(1882), there is the locals collecting shellfish from the tidal rock, an activity that Monet's children must have seen. Vacationers sometimes pretend to be locals, as we see in the guidebook illustrations of everyday life, but Monet, while living among other vacationers, erases their society in his paintings. When we look at those purple rocks and boiling water, we imagine we are the only audience. This painting presents a seascape that captures the beauty of nature, showing the intersection of land and sea tranquility and dynamics. This artwork centers on the interaction between jagged coastal rocks and the sea, with the angular irregularity of the rocks in the foreground emphasizing the cragginess of the shoreline, contrasting with the dark colors and white foam of the broken waves.

The depth of the seascape is expressed by the primary tones of blue, grey, and green, while the secondary tones of brown and black add depth and texture. Monet uses multiple layers to form or represent the stones in the foreground. Light green, grass green, and light blue are used to show the glossy side of the stones, while violet, dark blue, and dark brown are used to emphasize the dark side of the stones. In the more distant stones, violet is mixed with orange tones to show the properties of the earth and the reflective blue color of the sky. In the hues of the waves, blue-green, bright yellow, and cream blue, mixed with cream white, constitute the sea scene. Due to the reflection of the sunset, the overall quality of the color scheme is warm, contrasting with the cold quality of the stores on the sea.

One of the most famous artistic styles in Monet's impressionism is the use of more gentle strokes creates a simple sense of light and shadow and also reinforces the perspective effect. Thick and varied short strokes enhance the movement of waves and light reflection. Monet uses short, discontinuous brushstrokes overlapped with each other, expressively depicting the main bodies of the painting, the swaying sea level, the huge waves, and the rugged rocks. The stacking of many different pigments gives movement to the picture, and the swirling shape of water stacked with white curved strokes contrasts with the rough texture of the rock. The repeated use of oil paints adds to the three-dimensional effect, and the material that the paint protrudes on the canvas is like the protrusion of rocks and the splash of waves in reality.

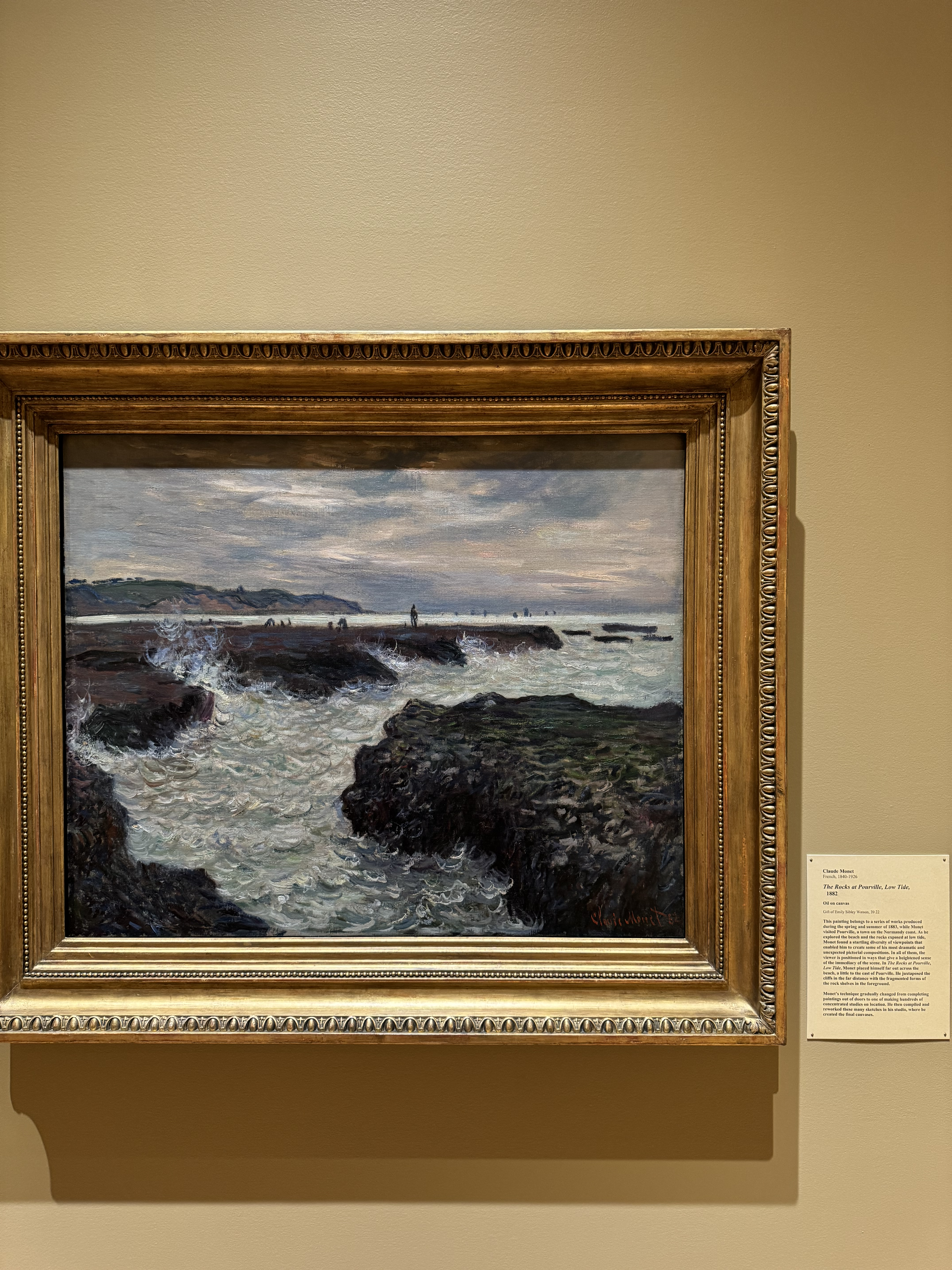
Claude Monet, The Rocks at Pourville, Low Tide. 1882, on view in the galleries at the Memorial Art Gallery, Rochester, NY

Monet tried to capture the fleeting effects of light. The soft blue-gray shading of the sky makes the diffuse texture of the warm white light even more pronounced. The sky is stacked with invisible brushstrokes, but a combination of dark blue and warm yellow with a pink tone, presenting the information of time, and the hazy gesture of clouds. The flat sky allows the viewer to focus on the dynamic wave shape. The overall composition is balanced and also shows natural vitality. The central stream of waves draws the viewer's eye across the rocks, focusing on the horizon in the distance. The mountains in the distance are drawn in less saturated color, and the outer outline of the mountains is depicted in a few clean and concise strokes, which creates depth and a sense of movement. The figures on the distant shore are small and fuzzy strokes that enhance linear perspective and reveal the vastness of nature. The shapes of the characters are dynamic with just a few dark strokes. Some stand leaning, some lean down, and further away, where the sea and sky meet, use cold white to emphasize the boundary line, and then use gray color blocks to show the image of distant stones. Here, the use of atmospheric perspective makes the rock appear a uniform gray-blue color with the sky.

== Context ==
Claude Monet lived and trained from the early 1840s to 1860s. In 1840, he was born in Paris and raised in Le Havre. From 1856 to 1862, Ogren Boudin introduced him to plein-air painting, which has since inspired him to capture outdoor light and atmosphere. He later studied with Charles Greier in Paris, where he met Renoir, Sisley, and Bazier, forming the basis of Impressionism. Their style is characterized by loose, visible brushstrokes, vibrant and unmixed colors, and an emphasis on outdoor scenes (Plein air paintings) that embrace time—spontaneity and immediacy—reflecting the desire to portray everyday life with emotional resonance and sensory depth. Examining the basis of Monet's visual language, and delving into the painting techniques Monet used in the Impressionist style, help us to dig deeply into later artworks' descriptions. The variation of light, color, brush strokes, and its ability to capture natural moments. These techniques allow Monet's work not only to present a natural scene but also to convey a sense of immediate experience.

In December 1871, the Monet family rented a villa in Argenteuil, and Monet began to concentrate on painting along the channel. According to Paul Hayes Tucker's research on Monet's Argenteuil era, the artist's fascination with marine motifs sprang from his childhood on the coast of Normandy, as seen by the abundance of paintings he created featuring rivers, seas, and boats. In 1878, Monet moved to Vetheuil, where in September 1879 Monet's wife Camille died after a long illness and Monet lived with the family of Alice and Ernest Hoschede, and as Hoschede spent more time away from home, Alice and Claude lived together like married --- the relationship added to Moent's emotional world affect his works at that time, and even the late works.

== The series works on the Normandy Coast ==
The work on the Normandy coast perfectly represents the transformation of Monet's work in the 1880 phase, that is, focusing on seascapes and small crowds of people to show the depth and meaning behind the picture. In his images of the northern coast, Monet focused on terrain with unique visual appeal. Monet's Normandy shore paintings, especially the ones that highlight low tides, cliffs, and rocks, frequently convey a feeling of peace and alone, casting the viewer in the role of an isolated observer of the expanse of nature.

Here are four “working” landscape canvases focused on fisherfolk, which were done during Monet’s second remaining time at Pourville, where he experienced the 1882 summer with Alice and their children. This Fishing Nets series has another famous fisherfolk canvas called Fishing Nets at Pourville (1882). The art style sharing of four canvases includes the landscape perspective and the activities shown by residents here. The landscape focuses on a nearby river, the foreground is seaweed-covered rocks, the horizon line is about two-thirds of the way up the canvas, and the horizon was cut in half by the distant cliffs. All four paintings depict similar scenes and subjects, apparently showing local fishermen catching shellfish in exposed tidal pools as fishing fleets head out to sea.

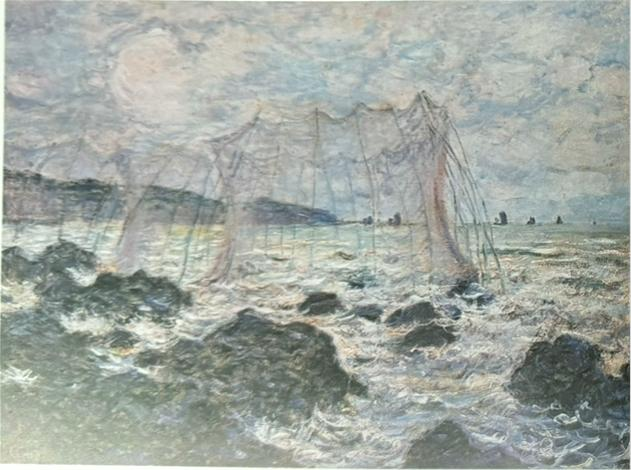
Claude Monet, Fishing Nets at Pourville, 1882, Kunstmuseum Den Haag

Capturing the dynamics of the lives of a small number of inhabitants as part of the Normandy coast there is also evidence of Monet's changing style of painting during the 1880s period. In his paintings, he evokes a lonely, even semi-mystical meditation on nature, a feeling that corresponds to an idealized, highly mediated view of these regions, as he resolutely masks any symbols of human invasion through tourism or the process of modernization. His depictions of the north coast have a uniquely immersive potential, reflecting a greater emphasis on "nature" rather than "society", which succinctly reflects the general evolution of his artistic concerns throughout the 1880s. Monet began to experiment with special compositional methods, as well as focusing on vast sky and water combined scenes to show changes in light and delicate emotional expression, which can be reflected in multiple Normandy Coast series.

== Monet's Impressionism ==
=== Changes around the 1880s ===
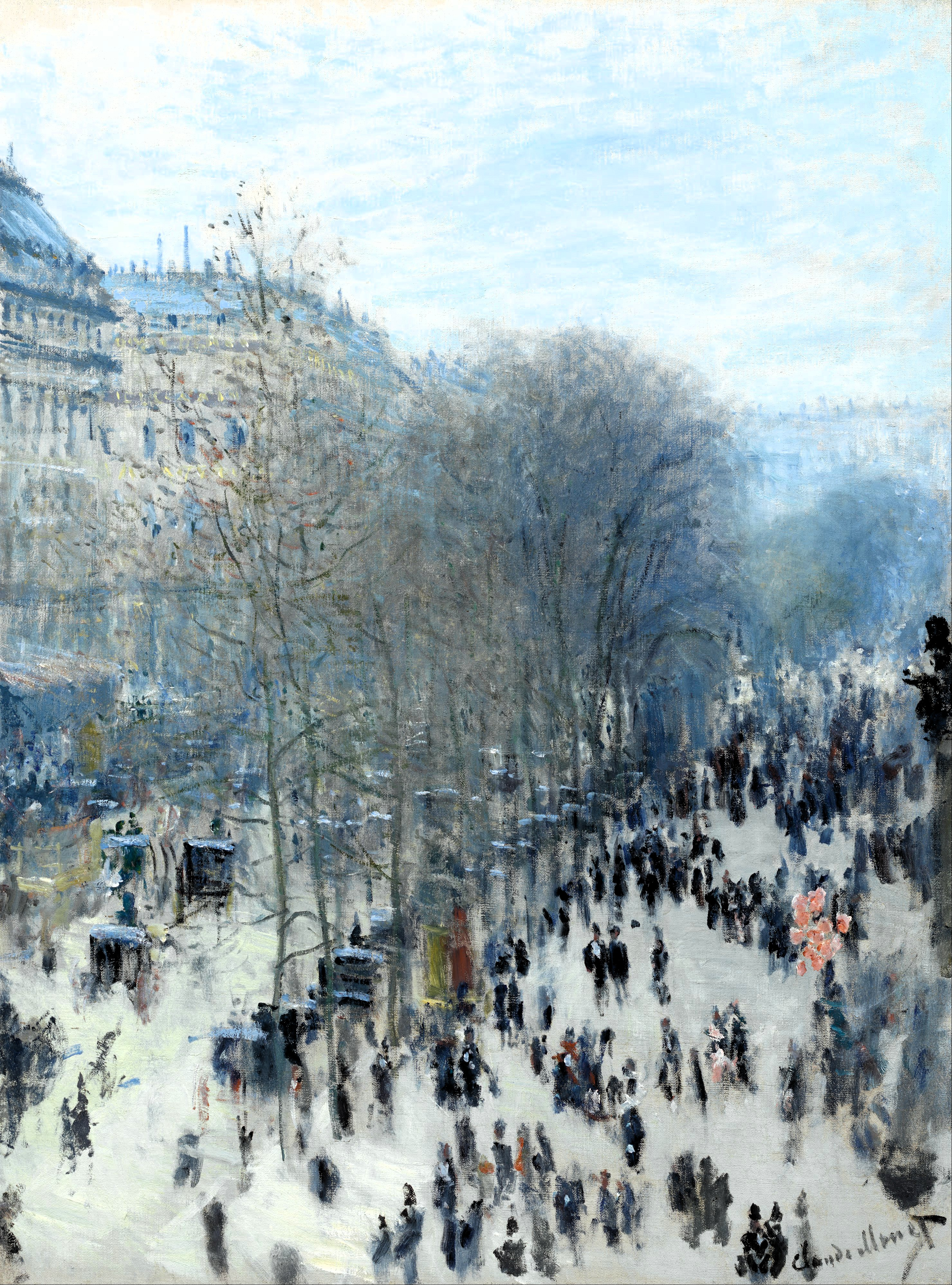
Claude Monet, Boulevard des Capucines, 1873-74, Oil on canvas, 61 x 80 cm, The Metropolitan Museum of Art, New York City, SL.6.2016.36.1.

In Monet's works before 1880, Monet focused on urban motifs. He usually shows rich use of brushstrokes and variations in tree's depiction. It is always difficult to define the characteristics of an artist's style in words, but in Monet's paintings, each stroke of the brush seems to belong firmly to the pictorial space of the painting, and when dealing with trees and shrubs, leaves, and branches always seem to combine into a single organic growth form. The works of this period were influenced by the rapid industrialization of Paris and focused on scenes in which large numbers of people gathered in the city to communicate. Famous examples include the Boulevard des Capucines series which shows the bustling crowds in Paris, and the train station scene with rapid industrial development.

Claude Monet, Low Tide, Pourville, 1882, Oil on canvas, 60 x 81cm, The Cleveland Museum of Art, Cleveland.

Works made after 1880, show fewer scenes, and fewer details. Take two works made by 1882 as examples. One is called Cliff Walk at Pourville(1882) and another is called Low Tide, Pourville (1882). Both of the works show the one-corner perspective, and the focus of a picture is often the corner of a seaside cliff or some coastal stones. Much of the new work is a departure from his earlier works, with Monet now searching for Spaces in and around the countryside to reveal its quiet secrets. Works of this period focused on rural landscapes, especially water features and sea screens.

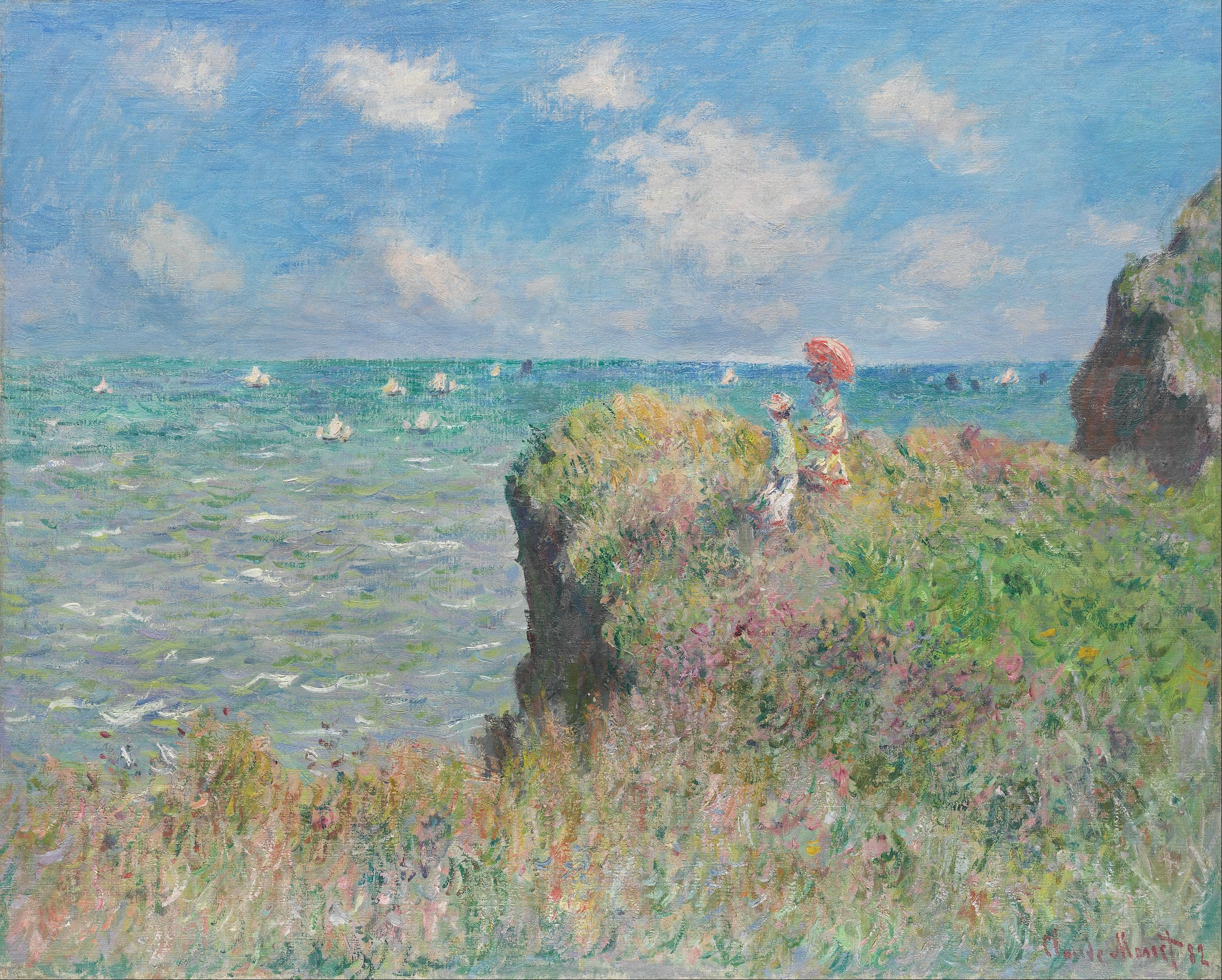
Claude Monet, Cliff Walk at Pourville, 1882, Oil on canvas, 66.5 × 82.3 cm, Art Institute of Chicago, Chicago 1933.443.

The Rocks at Pourville, Low Tide (1882) is one of the symbol works of that period. Monet developed techniques to capture the interaction of light and the atmosphere in a more sophisticated way, emphasizing the ephemeral effects of weather and time. His water features not only reflect the outside world but also reflect the emotional resonance of the heart. The third main change is the poetic and fanciful quality shown in the 1880s works. Different from the noisy city scene and the crowded crowd scene before the 1880s, when Monet transformed the main body of the picture into a varied water scene and a small number of groups, more colors and brushstrokes were changed to show the role of light, and the quiet picture also led the audience to slow down and experience the feelings contained in it. Monet's work in the 1880s and 1890s showed a deep unity of elements such as sky, sea, and land, creating a seamless sense of time and space. Monet's paintings in the 1890s represent the transition from his early Impressionist style to abstraction and symbolism. His use of color became more hallucinatory and dreamy, mixing scene elements in unnatural ways, such as turning grass into smoky powder tones.

=== Monet's Norman coastal works ===
Monet focused his pictures of the northern shore on topographies that had a strong visual identity.

- Space

Monet's works during the 1880s and 1890s show a deepening engagement with the unification of elements like sky, sea, and land, creating a seamless sense of time and space. Despite coming to Pourville as a vacationer, Monet, accompanied by brother Leon and Alice's family, blends in like a native. Vacationers sometimes pretend to be locals, and Monet, while living with other vacationers, erased the vacationers' society in his paintings, focusing instead on local life and natural scenery. Tucker mentioned that Monet's Normandy shore paintings, especially the ones that highlight low tides, cliffs, and rocks, frequently convey a feeling of peace and alone, casting the viewer in the role of an isolated observer of the expanse of nature.

- Brushstrokes

"Verbal definition of the characteristics of an artist's style is always difficult, but in Monet's paintings each stroke of the brush always seems to belong securely within the painting's pictorial space, and, in the treatment of trees and bushes, the foliage and branches always seem to unite into a single organic growing form." John mentioned that when describing different elements of the landscape, Monet would use different brushstrokes to show the influence of different winds on the scene. Like in The Rocks at Pourville, Low Tide (1882), the rich variety of brushstrokes, the use of various colors, the superposition of perspectival effects, and the presentation of natural scenes all reflect Impressionism's pursuit of the role of light and the characteristics of instantaneous scene recording. The natural scene is vague but expresses the strong emotion to viewers. We can see the magnificent sea and feel the cold atmosphere of the coast. But the distant sky, the people communicating on the shore, inject a warm life into the painting.

=== Monet's late works ===
The Rocks at Pourville, Low Tide (1882) was considered as the part of Monet's art works in his improving stage. Regina Michelle Schreck-Gaskin highlights the psychological depth of Monet's 1880s works. She pointed out that Monet's late work was not only capturing landscapes and light but also adding personal symbolism, incorporating Monet's own experience in life and tourism. Schreck-Gaskin argues that Monet's paintings of the Normandy coast, beginning in the 1880s, reflected a conscious struggle to control time and nature through art, but this problem was solved in later 1890s series of works based on Monet's discovery of a more abstract way of symbolism. The stylistic evolution of Monet's later work echoes his personal struggles, particularly the emotional transition following the death of his first wife, and his complicated relationship with Alice Horschede, which are also reflected in the paintings of the 1880s, in which Monet sought to find a balance between landscape, people, and time. In the 20th century, due to Monet's lack of vision, his work gradually transitioned to a more abstract style, and his later works influenced modern art movements such as abstract expressionism.
