= Grèges =

- Commune
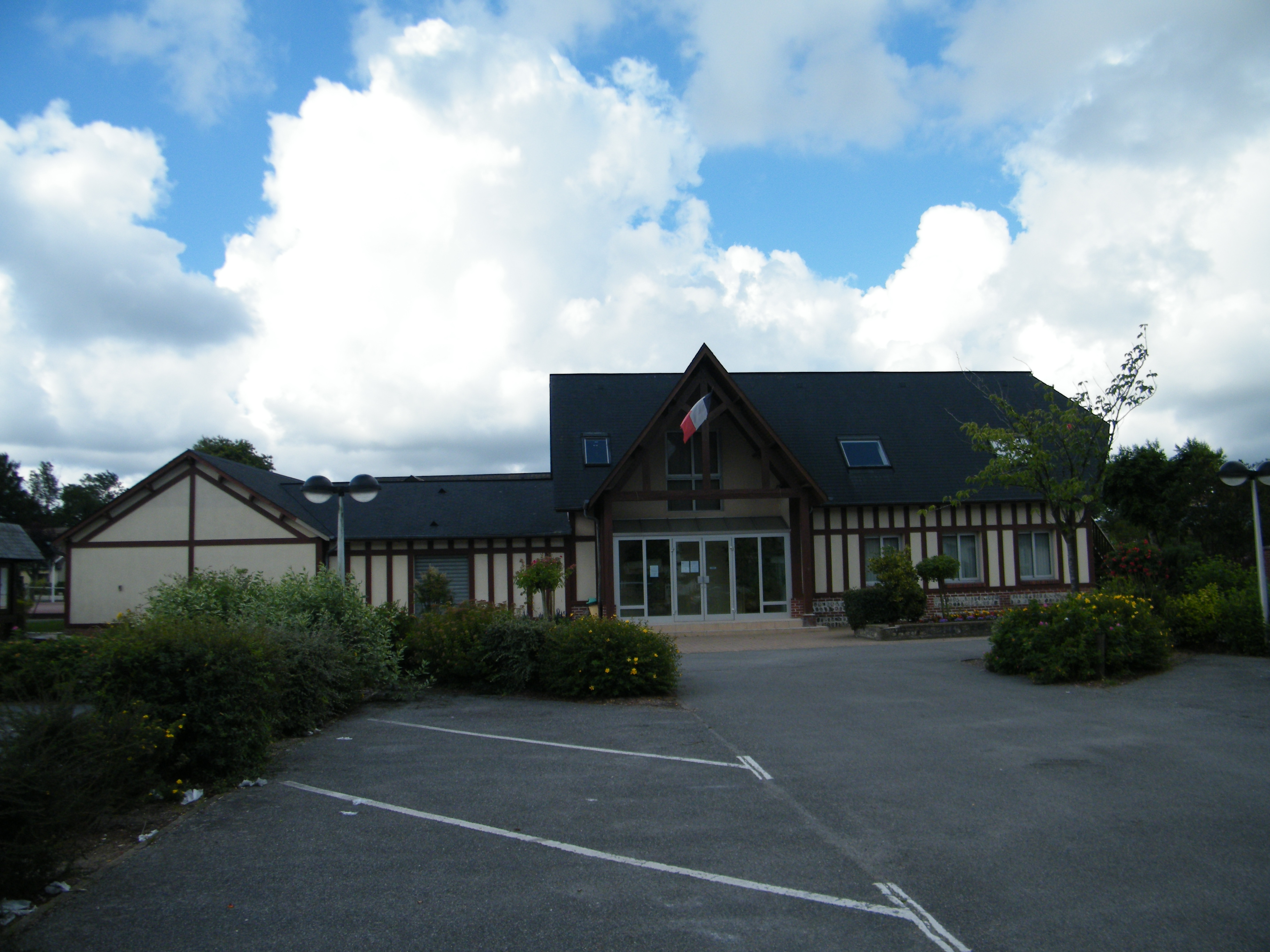
- The town hall in Grèges

- Coat of arms
- Location of Grèges
- Location within France Location within Normandy
- Coordinates: 49°55′25″N 1°08′45″E
- Country: France
- Region: Normandy
- Department: Seine-Maritime
- Arrondissement: Dieppe
- Canton: Dieppe-2
- Intercommunality: CA Région Dieppoise

Government
  - Mayor (2026–32): Bertrand Arent
- Area^{1}: 3.13 km^{2} (1.21 sq mi)
- Elevation: 95 m (312 ft)
- Highest elevation: 101 m (331 ft)
- Lowest elevation: 74 m (243 ft)
- Population (2023): 830
  - Density: 270/km^{2} (690/sq mi)
- Time zone: UTC+01:00 (CET)
  - Summer (DST): UTC+02:00 (CEST)
- INSEE/Postal code: 76324 /76370
- ^{1} French Land Register data, which excludes lakes, ponds, glaciers > 1 km^{2} (0.386 sq mi or 247 acres) and river estuaries.

Grèges (French pronunciation: [ɡʁɛʒ]) is a commune in the Seine-Maritime department in the Normandy region in northern France.

== Geography ==
A farming and suburban village situated in the Pays de Caux, some 2 miles (3.2 km) east of Dieppe at the junction of the D920 and the D100 roads.

== Heraldry ==
Arms of Grèges	The arms of Grèges are blazoned : Per pale gules and vert, a pallet ?raguly? argent between 4 fleurs-de-lys Or. (the centre charge might also be blasoned 'a lopped branch palewise', as it is not what English would describe as 'raguly'.

== Population ==
Historical population
Year	Pop.	±% p.a.
1968	333	—
1975	383	+2.02%
1982	594	+6.47%
1990	761	+3.15%
1999	742	−0.28%
2007	774	+0.53%
2012	807	+0.84%
2017	838	+0.76%
2023	830	−0.16%
Source: INSEE

== Places of interest ==
- The church of St.Madeleine, dating from the sixteenth century.
- The ruins of a 15th-century presbytery.

== See also ==
- Communes of the Seine-Maritime department
