= Tourville-sur-Arques =

- Commune
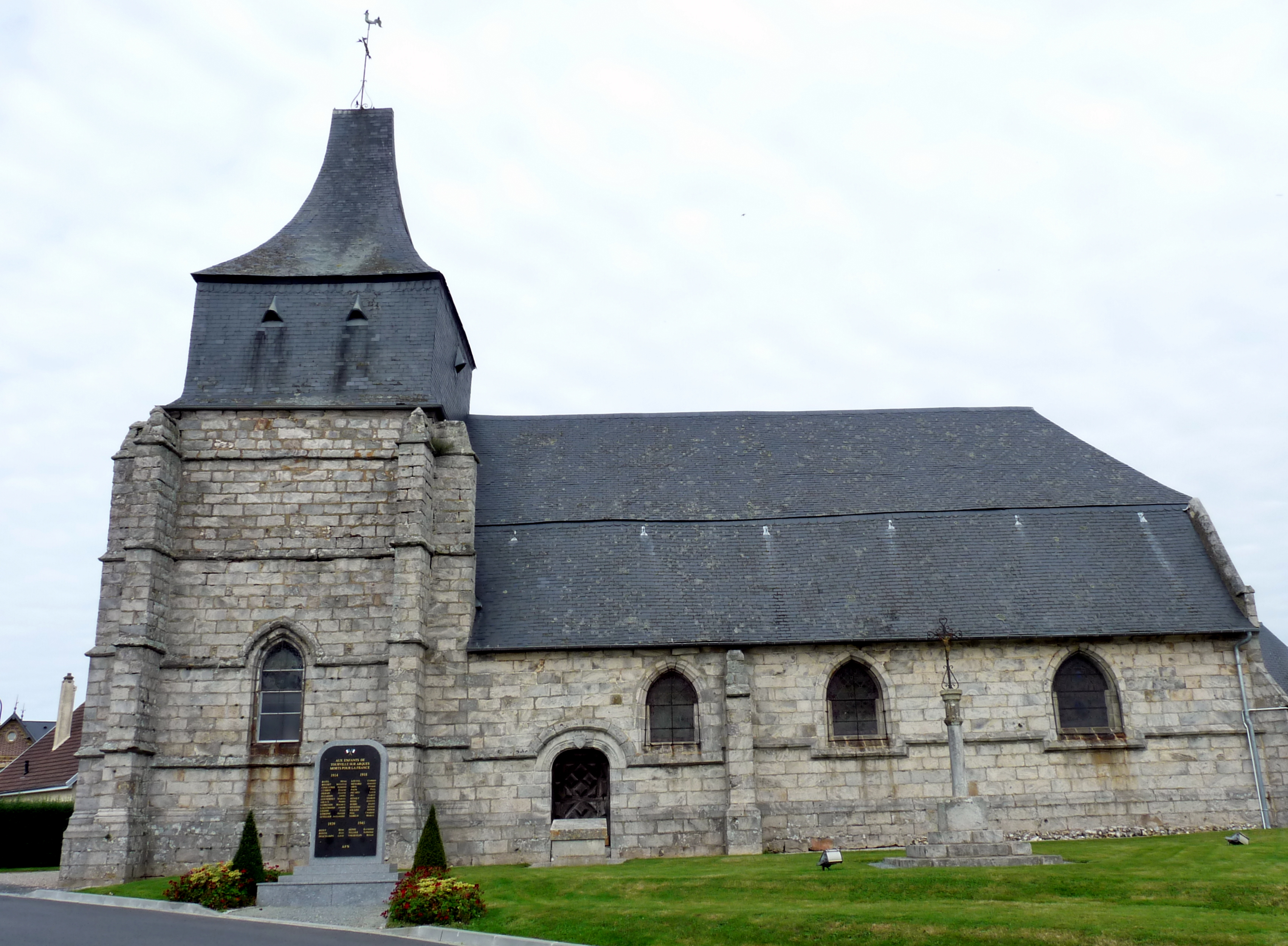
- The church in Tourville-sur-Arques
- Location of Tourville-sur-Arques
- Location within France Location within Normandy
- Coordinates: 49°51′32″N 1°06′08″E
- Country: France
- Region: Normandy
- Department: Seine-Maritime
- Arrondissement: Dieppe
- Canton: Dieppe-1
- Intercommunality: CA Région Dieppoise

Government
  - Mayor (2026–32): Yoann Collin
- Area^{1}: 5.9 km^{2} (2.3 sq mi)
- Elevation: 105 m (344 ft)
- Highest elevation: 113 m (371 ft)
- Lowest elevation: 20 m (66 ft)
- Population (2023): 1,187
  - Density: 200/km^{2} (520/sq mi)
- Time zone: UTC+01:00 (CET)
  - Summer (DST): UTC+02:00 (CEST)
- INSEE/Postal code: 76707 /76550
- ^{1} French Land Register data, which excludes lakes, ponds, glaciers > 1 km^{2} (0.386 sq mi or 247 acres) and river estuaries.

Tourville-sur-Arques (French pronunciation: [tuʁvil syʁ aʁk], literally Tourville on Arques) is a commune in the Seine-Maritime department in the Normandy region in northern France.

== Geography ==
A farming village situated by the banks of the river Scie in the Pays de Caux, some 5 miles (8.0 km) south of Dieppe at the junction of the D254, D70 and the D23 roads.

== Population ==
Historical population
Year	Pop.	±% p.a.
1968	687	—
1975	750	+1.26%
1982	877	+2.26%
1990	1,012	+1.81%
1999	1,080	+0.73%
2007	1,176	+1.07%
2012	1,235	+0.98%
2017	1,234	−0.02%
2023	1,187	−0.65%
Source: INSEE

== Places of interest ==
- The church of St. Martin, dating from the sixteenth century.
- The sixteenth-century Château of Miromesnil, with its park and gardens.

== People ==
- Guy de Maupassant, French writer, was born at the château in 1850.

== See also ==
- Communes of the Seine-Maritime department
