= Communauté d'agglomération de la Région Dieppoise =

Coordinates: 49.9222°N 1.07861°E

Région Dieppoise
- Communauté d'agglomération
- Country: France
- Region: Normandy
- Department: Seine-Maritime
- No. of communes: {{{nbcomm}}}
- Established: 2002

Government
  - President: Patrick Boulier
- Area: 129 km^{2} (50 sq mi)
- Population (2018): 46,223
  - Density: 358/km^{2} (928/sq mi)
- Website: Dieppe Maritime website

The Communauté d'agglomération de la région Dieppoise, also known as Dieppe Maritime, is the communauté d'agglomération, an intercommunal structure, centred on the city of Dieppe. It is located in the Seine-Maritime department, in the Normandy region, northern France. It was created on 31 December 2002. Its area is 129.0 km^{2}. Its population was 46,223 in 2018, of which 28,561 in Dieppe proper.

== Composition ==
The communauté d'agglomération consists of the following 16 communes:

1. Ancourt
2. Arques-la-Bataille
3. Aubermesnil-Beaumais
4. Colmesnil-Manneville
5. Dieppe
6. Grèges
7. Hautot-sur-Mer
8. Martigny
9. Martin-Église
10. Offranville
11. Rouxmesnil-Bouteilles
12. Saint-Aubin-sur-Scie
13. Sainte-Marguerite-sur-Mer
14. Sauqueville
15. Tourville-sur-Arques
16. Varengeville-sur-Mer

== See also ==
- Communes of the Seine-Maritime department
