= Canton of Dieppe-1 =

Coordinates: 49.92°N 1.08°E

- Canton
- Situation of the canton of Dieppe-1 in the department of Seine-Maritime
- Country: France
- Region: Normandy
- Department: Seine-Maritime
- No. of communes: {{{nbcomm}}}
- Population (2023): 31,826
- INSEE code: 7607

The canton of Dieppe-1 is an administrative division of the Seine-Maritime department, in northern France. It was created at the French canton reorganisation which came into effect in March 2015. Its seat is in Dieppe.

It consists of the following communes:

1. Ambrumesnil
2. Aubermesnil-Beaumais
3. Colmesnil-Manneville
4. Dieppe (partly)
5. Hautot-sur-Mer
6. Longueil
7. Martigny
8. Offranville
9. Ouville-la-Rivière
10. Quiberville
11. Rouxmesnil-Bouteilles
12. Saint-Aubin-sur-Scie
13. Saint-Denis-d'Aclon
14. Sainte-Marguerite-sur-Mer
15. Sauqueville
16. Tourville-sur-Arques
17. Varengeville-sur-Mer
