= Ambrumesnil =

- Commune
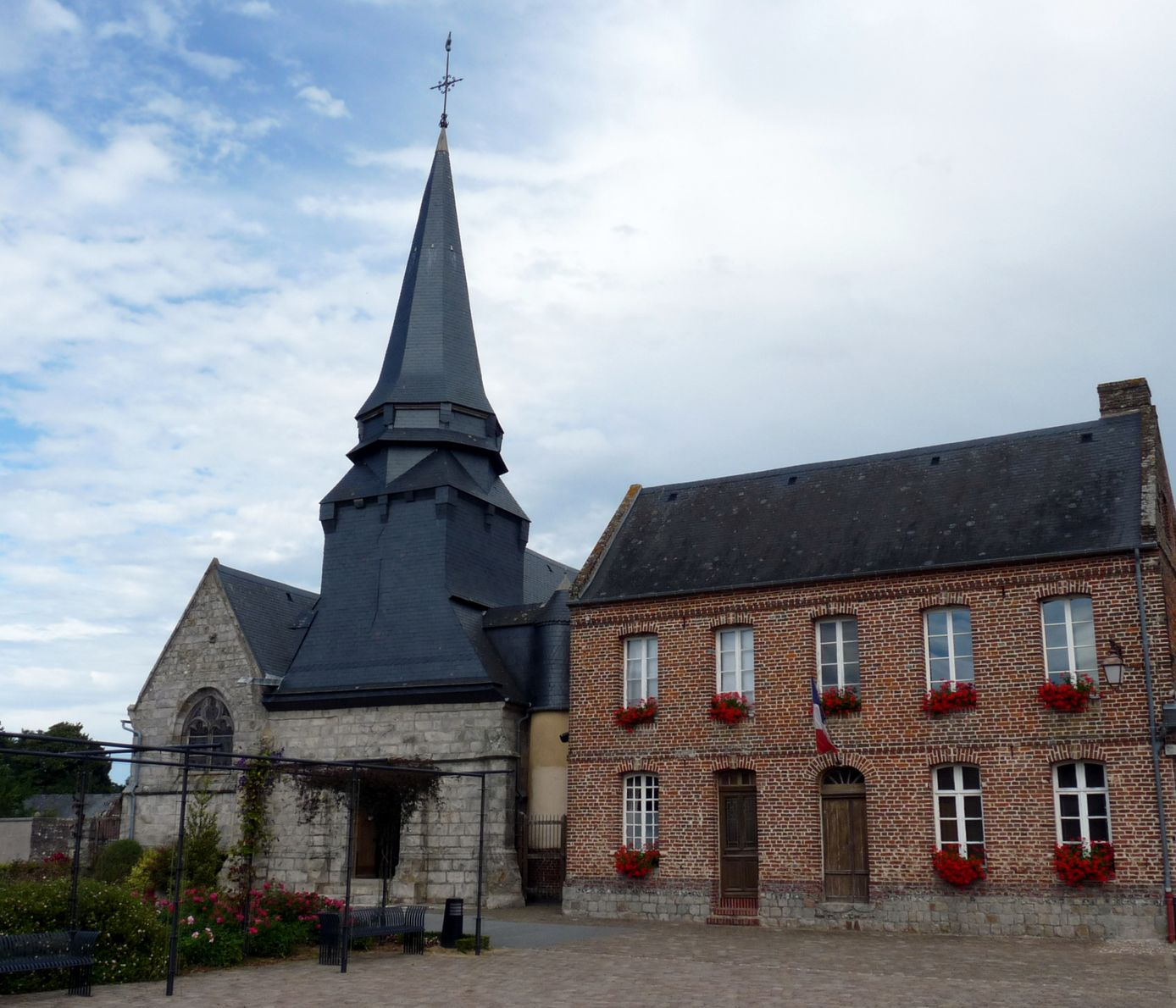
- The church and town hall in Ambrumesnil

- Coat of arms
- Location of Ambrumesnil
- Location within France Location within Normandy
- Coordinates: 49°51′30″N 0°59′42″E
- Country: France
- Region: Normandy
- Department: Seine-Maritime
- Arrondissement: Dieppe
- Canton: Dieppe-1
- Intercommunality: Terroir de Caux

Government
  - Mayor (2026–32): Mickaël Quibel
- Area^{1}: 5.14 km^{2} (1.98 sq mi)
- Elevation: 82 m (269 ft)
- Highest elevation: 88 m (289 ft)
- Lowest elevation: 11 m (36 ft)
- Population (2023): 520
  - Density: 100/km^{2} (260/sq mi)
- Time zone: UTC+01:00 (CET)
  - Summer (DST): UTC+02:00 (CEST)
- INSEE/Postal code: 76004 /76550
- ^{1} French Land Register data, which excludes lakes, ponds, glaciers > 1 km^{2} (0.386 sq mi or 247 acres) and river estuaries.

Ambrumesnil (French pronunciation: [ɑ̃bʁymenil]) is a commune in the Seine-Maritime department in the Normandy region in north-western France.

== Geography ==
A light industrial and farming village situated near the banks of the river Scie in the Pays de Caux, some 8 miles (13 km) southwest of Dieppe, at the junction of the D 123 and D 327 roads.

== Heraldry ==
Arms of Ambrumesnil	The arms of Ambrumesnil are blazoned : Azure, a latin cross surmounted by 2 stalks of wheat in saltire, all enfiled of a crown, between in base 3 fleurs de lys Or.

== Population ==
Historical population

Year	Pop.	±% p.a.
1793	410	—
1821	470	+0.49%
1846	488	+0.15%
1872	425	−0.53%
1901	360	−0.57%
1926	342	−0.20%
1946	344	+0.03%
1962	368	+0.42%
1968	358	−0.46%

Year	Pop.	±% p.a.
1975	326	−1.33%
1982	363	+1.55%
1990	401	+1.25%
1999	450	+1.29%
2007	517	+1.75%
2012	507	−0.39%
2017	472	−1.42%
2023	520	+1.63%

Source: EHESS and INSEE (1968–2023)

== Places of interest ==
- The church of St.Martin, dating from the twelfth century.
- The church at Ribeuf.

== See also ==
- Communes of the Seine-Maritime department
