= Martigny, Seine-Maritime =

Martigny
- Commune
- Location of Martigny
- Location within France Location within Normandy
- Coordinates: 49°51′56″N 1°09′11″E
- Country: France
- Region: Normandy
- Department: Seine-Maritime
- Arrondissement: Dieppe
- Canton: Dieppe-1
- Intercommunality: CA Région Dieppoise

Government
  - Mayor (2026–32): Antoine Brument
- Area^{1}: 5.06 km^{2} (1.95 sq mi)
- Elevation: 18 m (59 ft)
- Highest elevation: 117 m (384 ft)
- Lowest elevation: 6 m (20 ft)
- Population (2023): 405
  - Density: 80.0/km^{2} (207/sq mi)
- Time zone: UTC+01:00 (CET)
  - Summer (DST): UTC+02:00 (CEST)
- INSEE/Postal code: 76413 /76880
- ^{1} French Land Register data, which excludes lakes, ponds, glaciers > 1 km^{2} (0.386 sq mi or 247 acres) and river estuaries.

Martigny (French pronunciation: [maʁtiɲi]) is a commune in the Seine-Maritime department in the Normandy region in northern France.

== Geography ==
A farming village situated by the banks of the river Varenne in the Pays de Caux, some 5 miles (8.0 km) southeast of Dieppe on the D154 road. Large woods surround the commune to the south and west, with lakes and marshland to the north and east.

== Population ==
Historical population
Year	Pop.	±% p.a.
1968	249	—
1975	307	+3.04%
1982	441	+5.31%
1990	512	+1.88%
1999	531	+0.41%
2007	487	−1.08%
2012	466	−0.88%
2017	439	−1.19%
2023	405	−1.33%
Source: INSEE

== Places of interest ==
- The church of St.Martin, dating from the thirteenth century.
- The nineteenth-century chateau.
- An ancient river bridge.

== See also ==
- Communes of the Seine-Maritime department
