= Saint-Aubin-sur-Scie =

- Commune
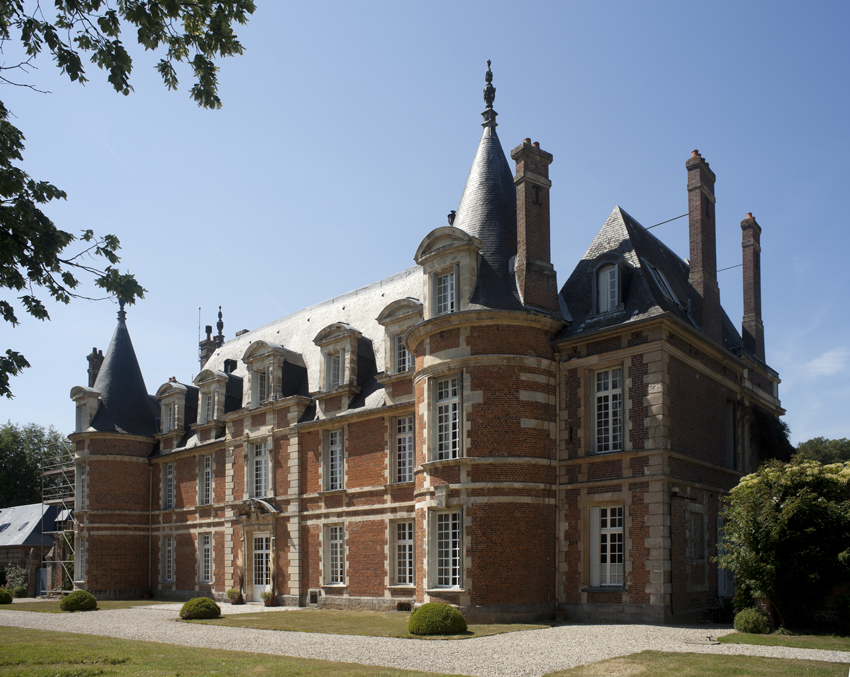
- The chateau of Miromesnil

- Coat of arms
- Location of Saint-Aubin-sur-Scie
- Location within France Location within Normandy
- Coordinates: 49°52′20″N 1°04′16″E
- Country: France
- Region: Normandy
- Department: Seine-Maritime
- Arrondissement: Dieppe
- Canton: Dieppe-1
- Intercommunality: CA Région Dieppoise

Government
  - Mayor (2026–32): Frédéric Canto
- Area^{1}: 7.74 km^{2} (2.99 sq mi)
- Elevation: 20 m (66 ft)
- Highest elevation: 105 m (344 ft)
- Lowest elevation: 9 m (30 ft)
- Population (2023): 1,219
  - Density: 157/km^{2} (408/sq mi)
- Time zone: UTC+01:00 (CET)
  - Summer (DST): UTC+02:00 (CEST)
- INSEE/Postal code: 76565 /76550
- ^{1} French Land Register data, which excludes lakes, ponds, glaciers > 1 km^{2} (0.386 sq mi or 247 acres) and river estuaries.

Saint-Aubin-sur-Scie (French pronunciation: [sɛ̃.t‿obɛ̃ syʁ si], literally Saint-Aubin on Scie) is a commune in the Seine-Maritime department in the Normandy region in northern France.

== Geography ==
A farming village situated by the banks of the river Scie in the Pays de Caux, at the junction of the D54 and the N 27 roads, some 5 miles (8.0 km) south of Dieppe.

== Heraldry ==
Arms of Saint-Aubin-sur-Scie	The arms of Saint-Aubin-sur-Scie are blazoned : Vert, a fess wavy argent between 2 mill wheels and a 3 stalks of wheat slipped and leaved, tied, Or.

== Population ==
Historical population
Year	Pop.	±% p.a.
1968	861	—
1975	966	+1.66%
1982	1,087	+1.70%
1990	1,111	+0.27%
1999	1,120	+0.09%
2007	1,208	+0.95%
2012	1,127	−1.38%
2017	1,085	−0.76%
2023	1,219	+1.96%
Source: INSEE

== Places of interest ==
- The seventeenth-century chateau of Miromesnil.
- A seventeenth-century chapel.
- The church of St. Aubin, dating from the thirteenth century.
- The chapel of St. Antoine, dating from the sixteenth century.

== See also ==
- Communes of the Seine-Maritime department
