= Sainte-Marguerite-sur-Mer =

- Commune
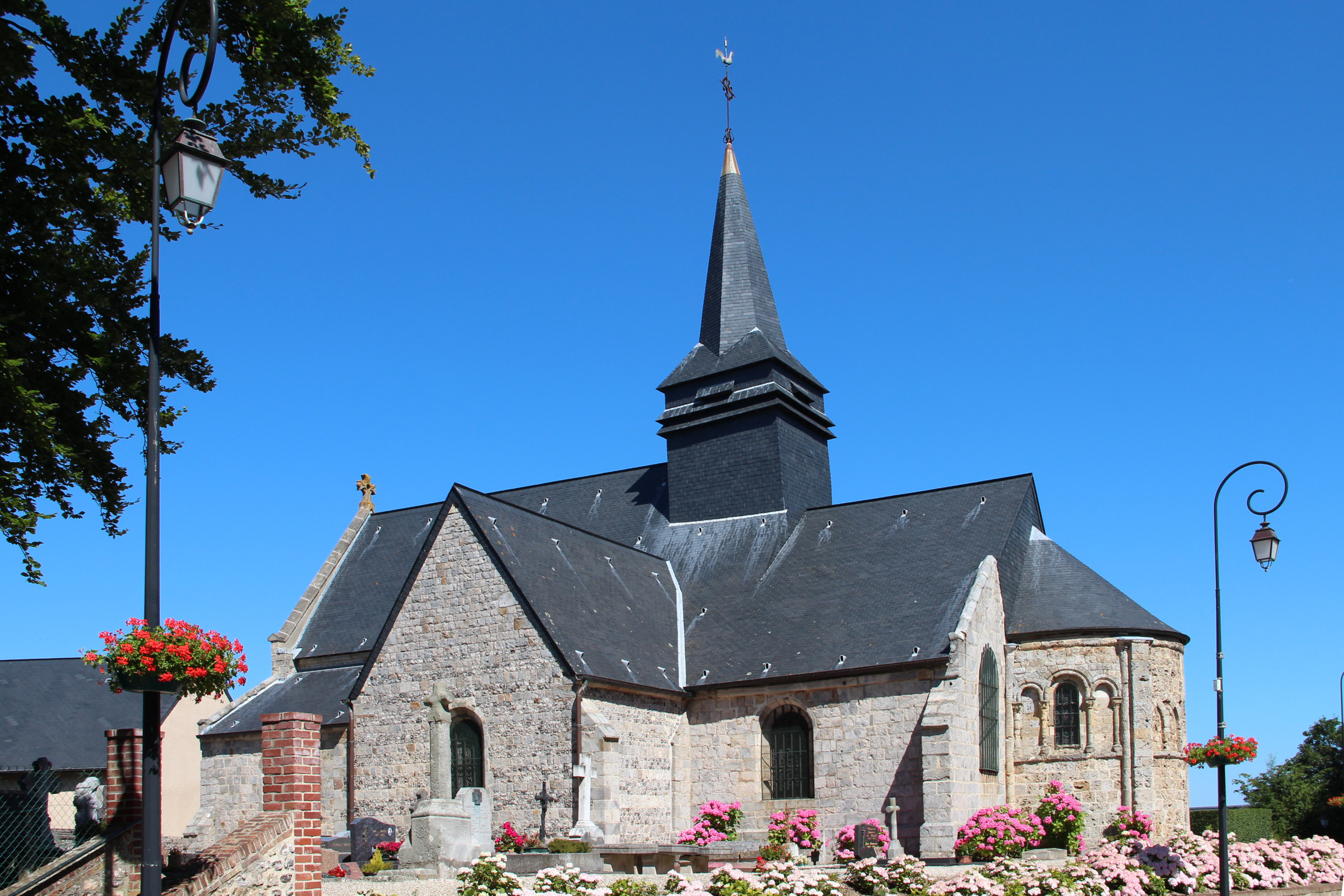
- The church in Sainte-Marguerite-sur-Mer

- Coat of arms
- Location of Sainte-Marguerite-sur-Mer
- Location within France Location within Normandy
- Coordinates: 49°54′29″N 0°56′53″E
- Country: France
- Region: Normandy
- Department: Seine-Maritime
- Arrondissement: Dieppe
- Canton: Dieppe-1
- Intercommunality: CA Région Dieppoise

Government
  - Mayor (2026–32): Véronique Depreux
- Area^{1}: 5.41 km^{2} (2.09 sq mi)
- Elevation: 35 m (115 ft)
- Highest elevation: 87 m (285 ft)
- Lowest elevation: 0 m (0 ft)
- Population (2023): 473
  - Density: 87.4/km^{2} (226/sq mi)
- Time zone: UTC+01:00 (CET)
  - Summer (DST): UTC+02:00 (CEST)
- INSEE/Postal code: 76605 /76119
- ^{1} French Land Register data, which excludes lakes, ponds, glaciers > 1 km^{2} (0.386 sq mi or 247 acres) and river estuaries.

Sainte-Marguerite-sur-Mer (French pronunciation: [sɛ̃t maʁɡəʁit syʁ mɛʁ], literally Sainte-Marguerite on Sea) is a commune in the Seine-Maritime department in the Normandy region in northern France.

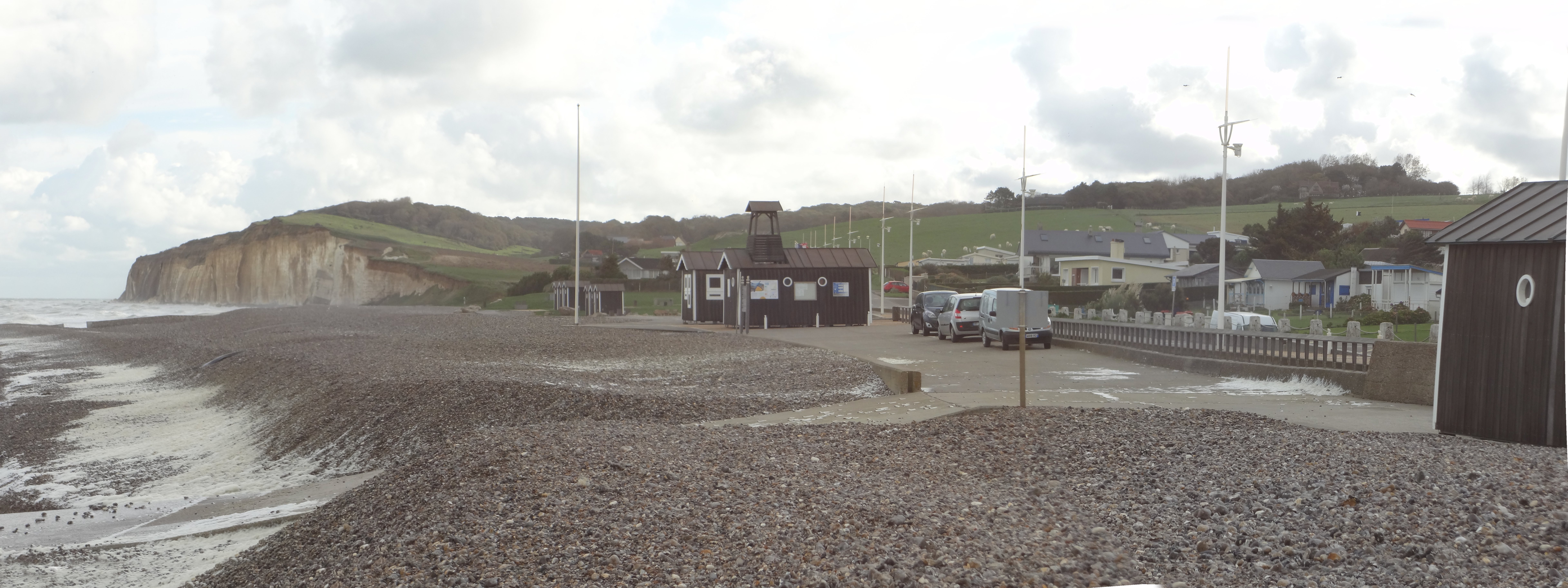
Beach

== Geography ==
A farming and coastal village situated in the Pays de Caux, some 6 miles (9.7 km) west of Dieppe at the junction of the D75 and the D323 roads. Huge chalk cliffs rise up from a pebble beach overlooking the English Channel, to form the northern border of the commune.

== Heraldry ==
Arms of Sainte-Marguerite-sur-Mer	The arms of Sainte-Marguerite-sur-Mer are blazoned : Argent, the inscription (in two lines) "Ste. Marguerite/sur Mer" and in base a bar gemel wavy azure, and on a chief wavy gules 5 marguerite daisies slipped and leaved of the field 2 & 3.

== Population ==
Historical population
Year	Pop.	±% p.a.
1968	249	—
1975	306	+2.99%
1982	465	+6.16%
1990	506	+1.06%
1999	502	−0.09%
2007	499	−0.07%
2012	496	−0.12%
2017	477	−0.78%
2023	473	−0.14%
Source: INSEE

== Places of interest ==
- The Vastérival gardens.
- The church of St. Marguerite, dating from the eleventh century.
- The sixteenth-century château de la Tour and its dovecote.
- A donjon.
- The lighthouse, rebuilt in 1955.

== See also ==
- Communes of the Seine-Maritime department
