= Ouville-la-Rivière =

- Commune
- Coat of arms
- Location of Ouville-la-Rivière
- Location within France Location within Normandy
- Coordinates: 49°52′25″N 0°57′37″E
- Country: France
- Region: Normandy
- Department: Seine-Maritime
- Arrondissement: Dieppe
- Canton: Dieppe-1
- Intercommunality: CC Terroir de Caux

Government
  - Mayor (2020–2026): Loïc Paillard
- Area^{1}: 6.34 km^{2} (2.45 sq mi)
- Elevation: 9 m (30 ft)
- Highest elevation: 74 m (243 ft)
- Lowest elevation: 7 m (23 ft)
- Population (2023): 452
  - Density: 71.3/km^{2} (185/sq mi)
- Time zone: UTC+01:00 (CET)
  - Summer (DST): UTC+02:00 (CEST)
- INSEE/Postal code: 76492 /76860
- ^{1} French Land Register data, which excludes lakes, ponds, glaciers > 1 km^{2} (0.386 sq mi or 247 acres) and river estuaries.

Ouville-la-Rivière (French pronunciation: [uvil la ʁivjɛʁ]) is a commune in the Seine-Maritime department in the Normandy region in north-western France.

== Geography ==
The commune is a village of farming and light industry situated by the banks of the river Saâne in the Pays de Caux at the junction of the D 27, D 54 and the D 925 roads, 6 miles (9.7 km) southwest of Dieppe.

== Population ==
Historical population

Year	Pop.	±% p.a.
1793	422	—
1821	484	+0.49%
1846	637	+1.10%
1872	630	−0.04%
1901	606	−0.13%
1926	616	+0.07%
1946	650	+0.27%
1962	674	+0.23%
1968	642	−0.81%

Year	Pop.	±% p.a.
1975	645	+0.07%
1982	609	−0.82%
1990	634	+0.50%
1999	602	−0.57%
2007	580	−0.46%
2012	537	−1.53%
2017	495	−1.62%
2023	452	−1.50%

Source: EHESS and INSEE (1968-2023)

== Places of interest ==
- A yew tree nearly 1000 years old.
- The eighteenth-century château de Tous les Mesnils, open to visitors on weekend afternoons in the summer.
- The manorhouse du Tessy, now a guesthouse.
- The château d'Ouville, damaged during World War II, and not yet completely rebuilt.
- The church of St. Gilles, dating from the eleventh century.
- A sixteenth-century stone cross.

== See also ==
- Communes of the Seine-Maritime department
