= Sauqueville =

- Commune
- Location of Sauqueville
- Location within France Location within Normandy
- Coordinates: 49°51′24″N 1°04′15″E
- Country: France
- Region: Normandy
- Department: Seine-Maritime
- Arrondissement: Dieppe
- Canton: Dieppe-1
- Intercommunality: CA Région Dieppoise

Government
  - Mayor (2026–32): Denis Grenon
- Area^{1}: 3.39 km^{2} (1.31 sq mi)
- Elevation: 20 m (66 ft)
- Highest elevation: 93 m (305 ft)
- Lowest elevation: 21 m (69 ft)
- Population (2023): 354
  - Density: 104/km^{2} (270/sq mi)
- Time zone: UTC+01:00 (CET)
  - Summer (DST): UTC+02:00 (CEST)
- INSEE/Postal code: 76667 /76550
- ^{1} French Land Register data, which excludes lakes, ponds, glaciers > 1 km^{2} (0.386 sq mi or 247 acres) and river estuaries.

Sauqueville (French pronunciation: [sokvil]) is a commune in the Seine-Maritime department in the Normandy region in north-western France.

== Geography ==
A farming village situated in the valley of the Scie river in the Pays de Caux, some 4 miles (6.4 km) south of Dieppe at the junction of the D 927, D 3 and D 70 roads.

== Population ==
Historical population

Year	Pop.	±% p.a.
1793	244	—
1821	311	+0.87%
1846	345	+0.42%
1872	365	+0.22%
1901	350	−0.14%
1926	336	−0.16%
1946	329	−0.11%
1962	326	−0.06%
1968	351	+1.24%

Year	Pop.	±% p.a.
1975	323	−1.18%
1982	326	+0.13%
1990	360	+1.25%
1999	360	+0.00%
2007	359	−0.03%
2012	372	+0.71%
2017	345	−1.50%
2023	354	+0.43%

Source: EHESS and INSEE (1968-2023)

== Places of interest ==
- The Church of Sainte-Croix, dating from the nineteenth century.

== See also ==
- Communes of the Seine-Maritime department
