= Colmesnil-Manneville =

- Commune
- Location of Colmesnil-Manneville
- Location within France Location within Normandy
- Coordinates: 49°50′58″N 1°02′04″E
- Country: France
- Region: Normandy
- Department: Seine-Maritime
- Arrondissement: Dieppe
- Canton: Dieppe-1
- Intercommunality: CA Région Dieppoise

Government
  - Mayor (2026–32): Marie-Laure Dufour
- Area^{1}: 1.91 km^{2} (0.74 sq mi)
- Elevation: 70 m (230 ft)
- Highest elevation: 90 m (300 ft)
- Lowest elevation: 77 m (253 ft)
- Population (2023): 106
  - Density: 55.5/km^{2} (144/sq mi)
- Time zone: UTC+01:00 (CET)
  - Summer (DST): UTC+02:00 (CEST)
- INSEE/Postal code: 76184 /76550
- ^{1} French Land Register data, which excludes lakes, ponds, glaciers > 1 km^{2} (0.386 sq mi or 247 acres) and river estuaries.

Colmesnil-Manneville (French pronunciation: [kɔlmenil manvil]) is a commune in the Seine-Maritime department in the Normandy region in north-western France.

== Geography ==
A small farming village situated in the Pays de Caux, some 8 miles (13 km) south of Dieppe, at the junction of the D 55 and the D 70 roads.

== Population ==
Historical population

Year	Pop.	±% p.a.
1793	147	—
1821	122	−0.66%
1846	150	+0.83%
1872	97	−1.66%
1901	71	−1.07%
1926	76	+0.27%
1946	72	−0.27%
1962	79	+0.58%
1968	71	−1.76%

Year	Pop.	±% p.a.
1975	64	−1.47%
1982	73	+1.90%
1990	115	+5.85%
1999	140	+2.21%
2007	128	−1.11%
2012	109	−3.16%
2017	107	−0.37%
2023	106	−0.16%

Source: EHESS and INSEE (1968-2023)

== Places of interest ==
- The church of St. Georges, dating from the eleventh century.

== See also ==
- Communes of the Seine-Maritime department
