= Rouxmesnil-Bouteilles =

- Commune
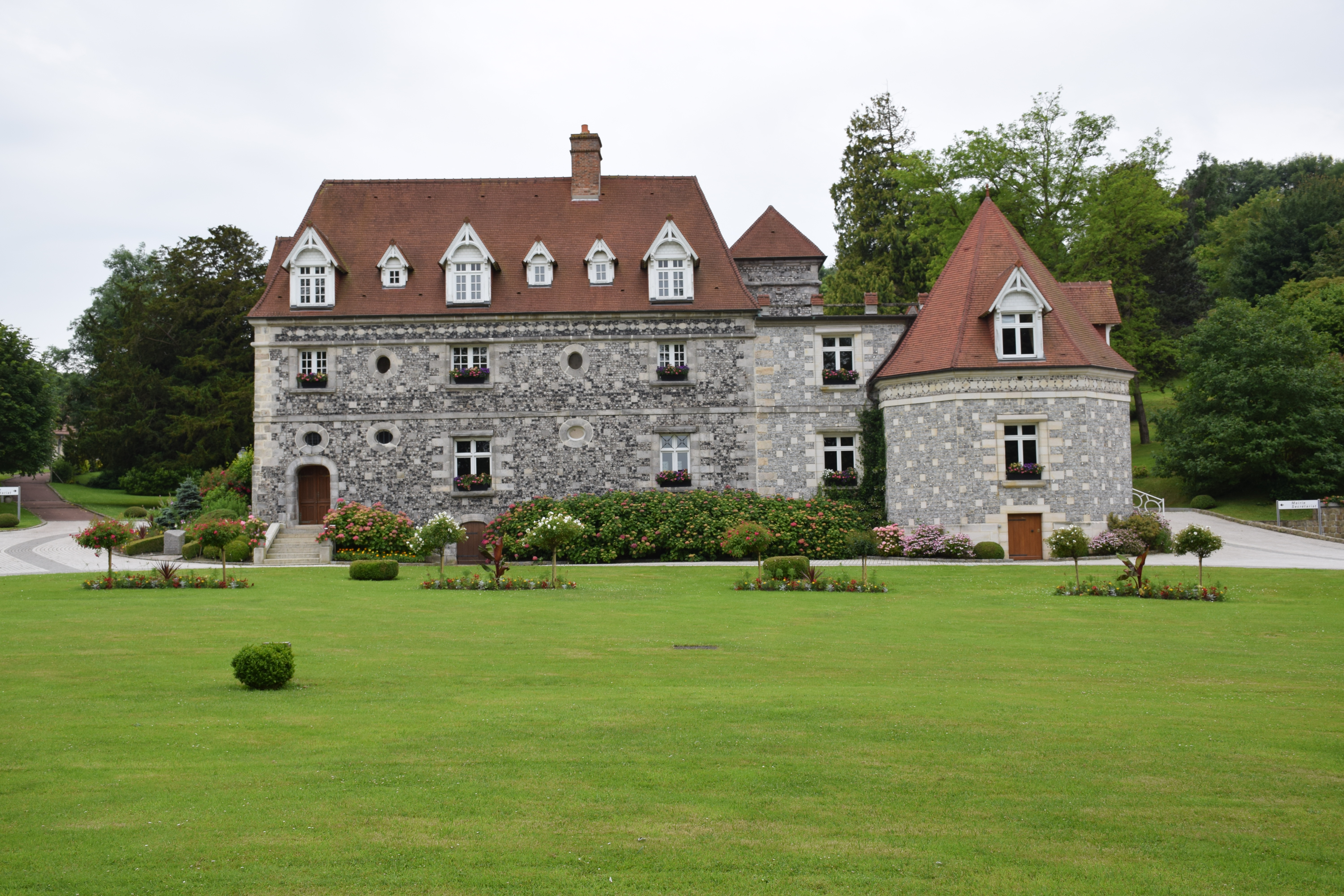
- The town hall in Rouxmesnil-Bouteilles
- Location of Rouxmesnil-Bouteilles
- Location within France Location within Normandy
- Coordinates: 49°54′21″N 1°05′28″E
- Country: France
- Region: Normandy
- Department: Seine-Maritime
- Arrondissement: Dieppe
- Canton: Dieppe-1
- Intercommunality: CA Région Dieppoise

Government
  - Mayor (2020–2026): Jean-Claude Grout
- Area^{1}: 5.62 km^{2} (2.17 sq mi)
- Elevation: 685 m (2,247 ft)
- Highest elevation: 99 m (325 ft)
- Lowest elevation: 1 m (3.3 ft)
- Population (2023): 1,798
  - Density: 320/km^{2} (829/sq mi)
- Time zone: UTC+01:00 (CET)
  - Summer (DST): UTC+02:00 (CEST)
- INSEE/Postal code: 76545 /76370
- ^{1} French Land Register data, which excludes lakes, ponds, glaciers > 1 km^{2} (0.386 sq mi or 247 acres) and river estuaries.

Rouxmesnil-Bouteilles (French pronunciation: [ʁumenil butɛj]) is a commune in the Seine-Maritime department in the Normandy region in northern France.

== Geography ==
A small ex-farming town but now mostly involved with light industry, situated by the banks of the river Arques in the Pays de Caux at the junction of the D154 and the D154e roads, immediately south of Dieppe.

== Population ==
Historical population
Year	Pop.	±% p.a.
1968	874	—
1975	1,012	+2.12%
1982	1,137	+1.68%
1990	1,693	+5.10%
1999	1,781	+0.56%
2007	1,840	+0.41%
2012	1,974	+1.42%
2017	1,847	−1.32%
2023	1,798	−0.45%
Source: INSEE

== Places of interest ==
- A sixteenth century priory.
- A sixteenth century manorhouse, once the mairie.

== See also ==
- Communes of the Seine-Maritime department
