= Varengeville-sur-Mer =

- Commune
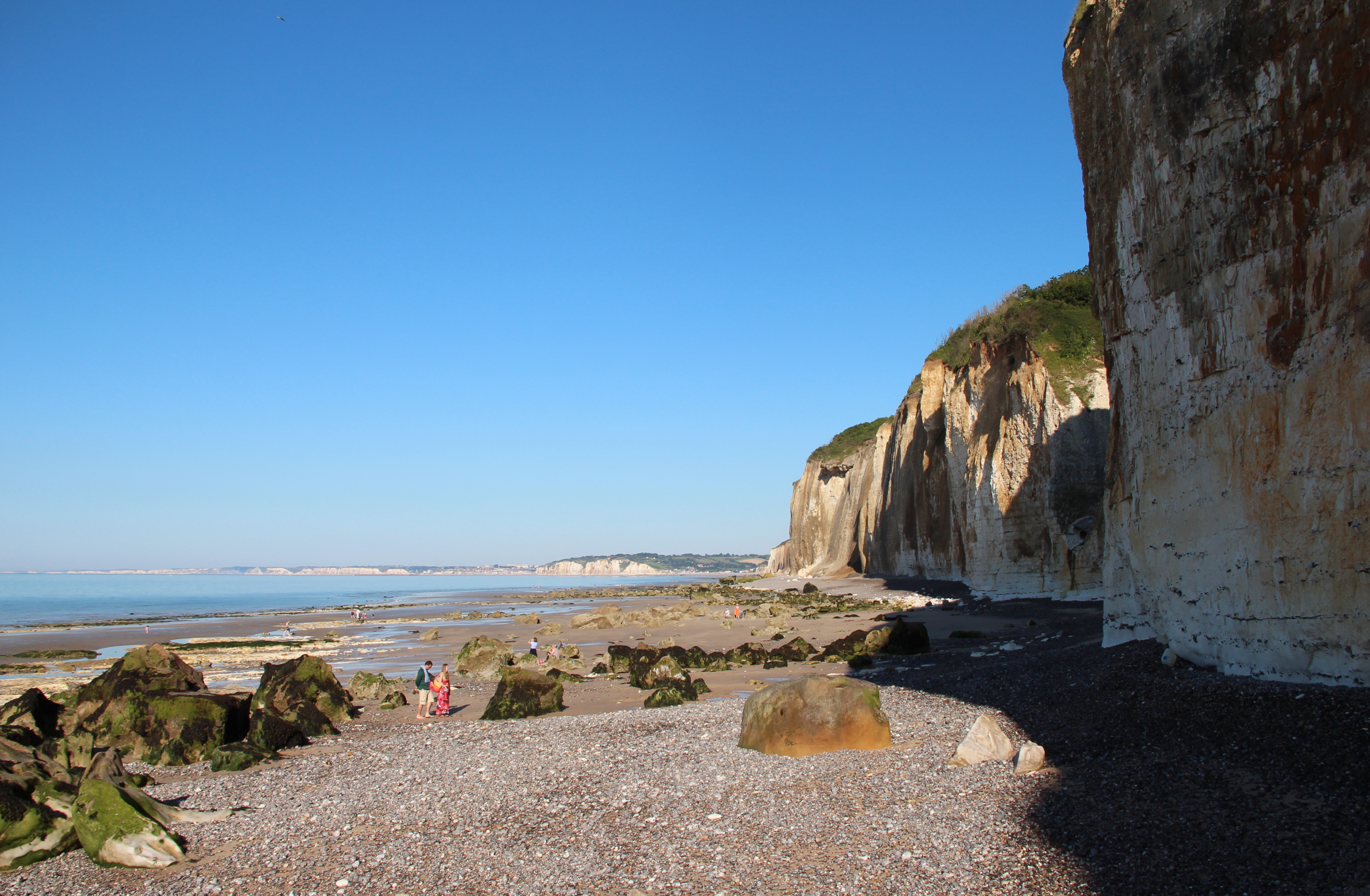
- Vastérival Beach, in Varengeville-sur-Mer

- Coat of arms
- Location of Varengeville-sur-Mer
- Location within France Location within Normandy
- Coordinates: 49°54′24″N 0°59′44″E
- Country: France
- Region: Normandy
- Department: Seine-Maritime
- Arrondissement: Dieppe
- Canton: Dieppe-1
- Intercommunality: CA Région Dieppoise

Government
  - Mayor (2026–32): Patrick Boulier
- Area^{1}: 10.75 km^{2} (4.15 sq mi)
- Elevation: 90 m (300 ft)
- Highest elevation: 102 m (335 ft)
- Lowest elevation: 0 m (0 ft)
- Population (2023): 969
  - Density: 90.1/km^{2} (233/sq mi)
- Time zone: UTC+01:00 (CET)
  - Summer (DST): UTC+02:00 (CEST)
- INSEE/Postal code: 76720 /76119
- ^{1} French Land Register data, which excludes lakes, ponds, glaciers > 1 km^{2} (0.386 sq mi or 247 acres) and river estuaries.

Varengeville-sur-Mer (French pronunciation: [vaʁɑ̃ʒvil syʁ mɛʁ], literally Varengeville on Sea) is a commune in the Seine-Maritime department in the Normandy region in north-western France.

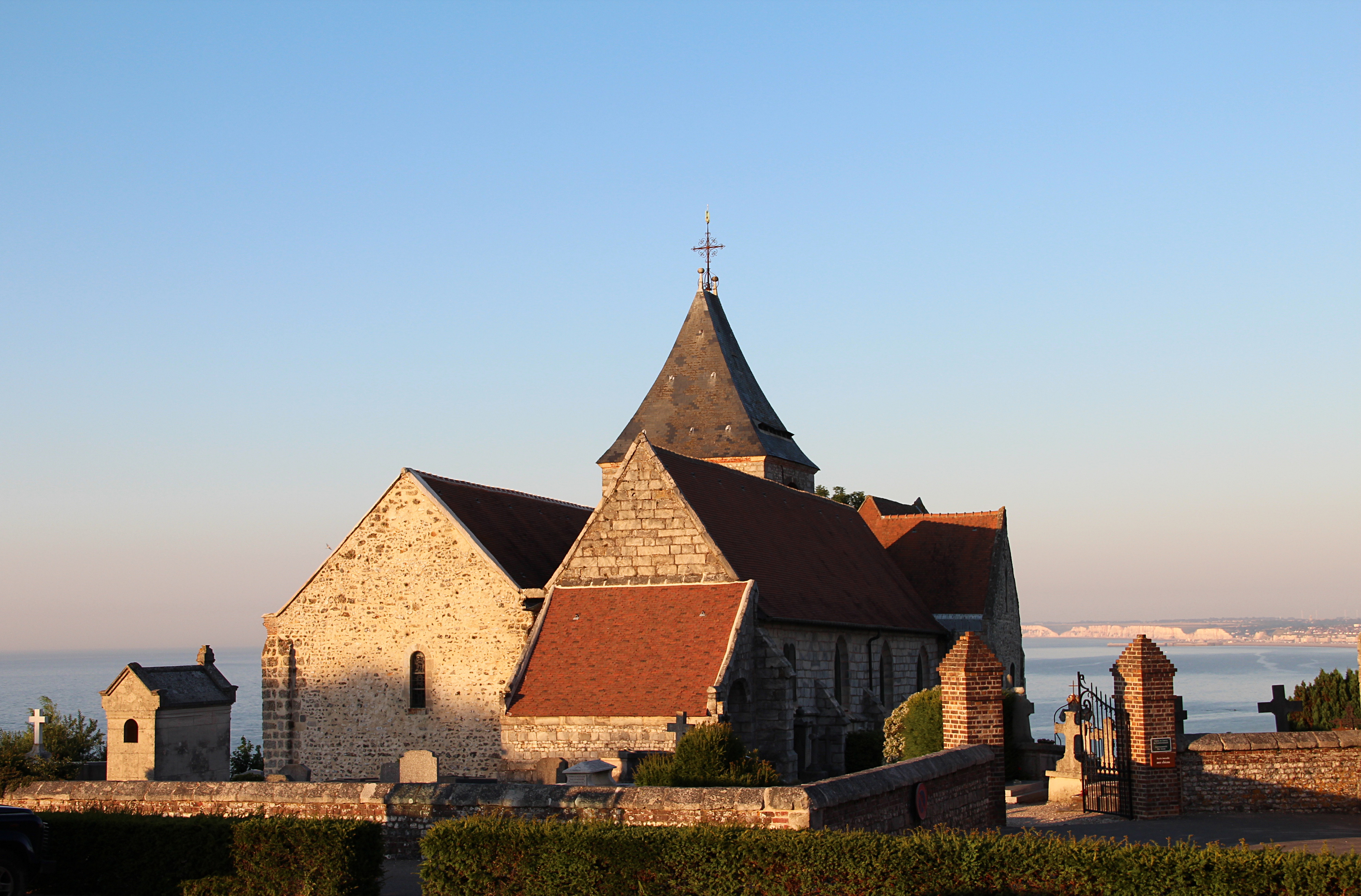

== Geography ==
A forestry and farming commune situated by the coast of the English Channel and in the Pays de Caux, some 5 miles (8.0 km) west of Dieppe at the junction of the D27, D75 and the D123 roads. The commune has access to the pebble beach by means of a gap in the huge chalk cliffs.

== Heraldry ==
Arms of Varengeville-sur-Mer	The arms of Varengeville-sur-Mer are blazoned : Gules, a mullet of 8 argent pierced azure, on a chief argent a lion passant gules.

== Population ==
Historical population
Year	Pop.	±% p.a.
1968	986	—
1975	998	+0.17%
1982	1,050	+0.73%
1990	1,048	−0.02%
1999	1,179	+1.32%
2007	1,056	−1.37%
2012	1,013	−0.83%
2017	957	−1.13%
2023	969	+0.21%
Source: INSEE

== Places of interest ==
La maison du douanier de Varengeville (Customs officer's house), by Monet, 1882

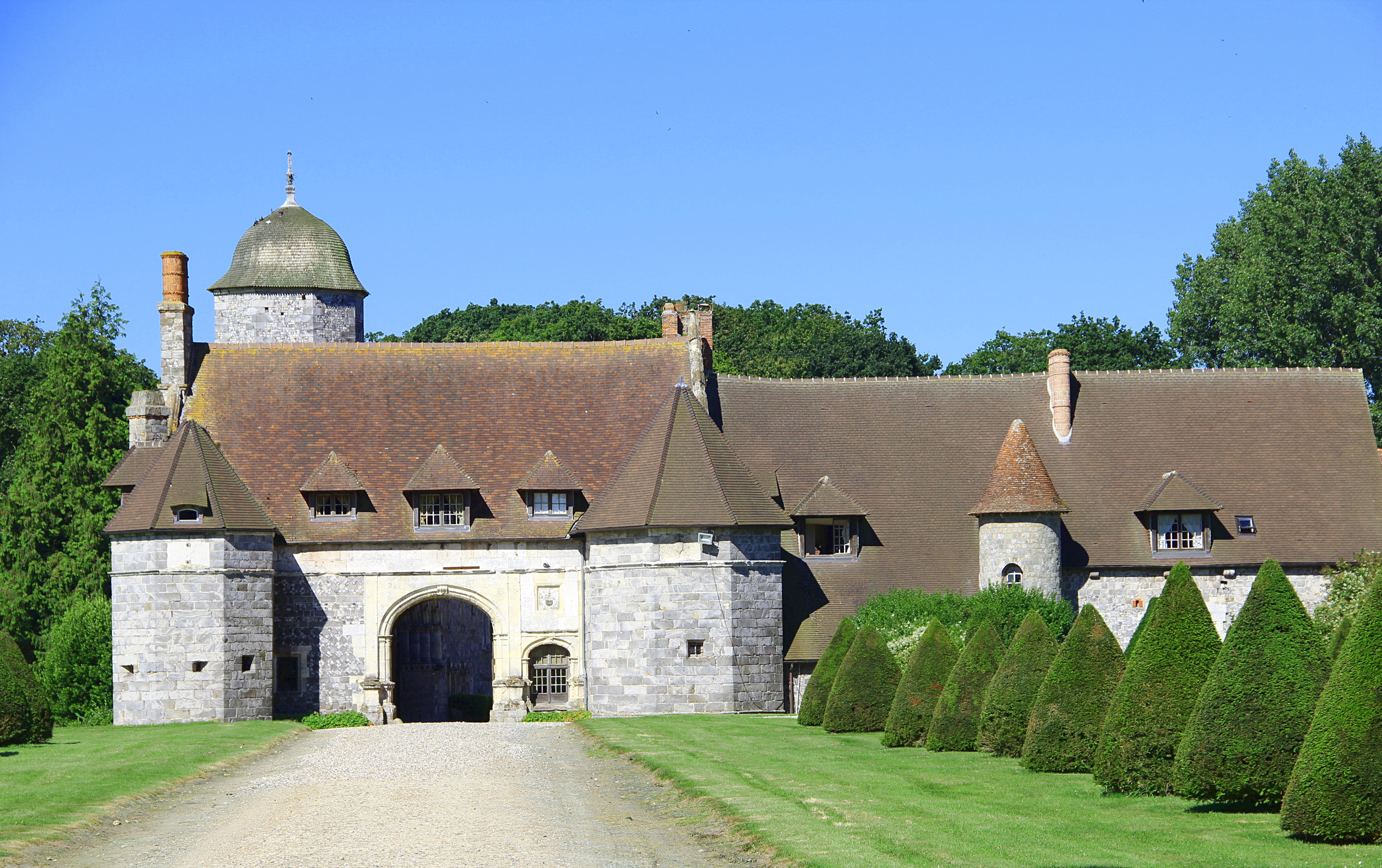
Jean d'Ango manor

- The manorhouse known as the Manoir d'Ango, built between 1530 and 1545 by Jean Ango,
- The church of St. Valery, dating from the thirteenth century, sits atop the cliffs and is at risk of falling into the sea if the cliff were to collapse in any way. The churchyard holds the tomb of the Cubist artist Georges Braque, topped by a mosaic of a white dove. Inside the church is a stained glass window by Braque depicting the Tree of Jesse.
- The chapel of St. Dominique, on the road from Varengeville to Dieppe, with more stained glass windows by Braque.
- Two chateaus, at Saint-Aubin and Quesnot.
- The sixteenth century hunting lodge of King Francis I.
- The cemetery, by the sea, with a sixteenth-century sandstone cross and containing the tombs of some famous Frenchmen: the writer Georges de Porto-Riche, composer Albert Roussel, Georges Braque and the architect, Paul Nelson.
- The ‘Maison du Bois des Moutiers'Bois des Moutiers, near the church, was conceived by Guillaume Mallet in 1898 and designed by the architect Sir Edwin Lutyens. It was one of Lutyens' first commissions. A Burne-Jones tapestry hangs in the stairwell, its designs copied from Renaissance cloth in William Morris's studio. The house is surrounded by a 9-acre park, with gardens designed by Miss Gertrude Jekyll. The estate was purchased by Jerome Seydoux in March 2019.
- 'Shamrock', which has the biggest collection of hortensias in the world, with more than 1000 varieties. This collection has been assembled by the ‘Conservatoire français des collections végétales spécialisées' (CCVS).

== People ==
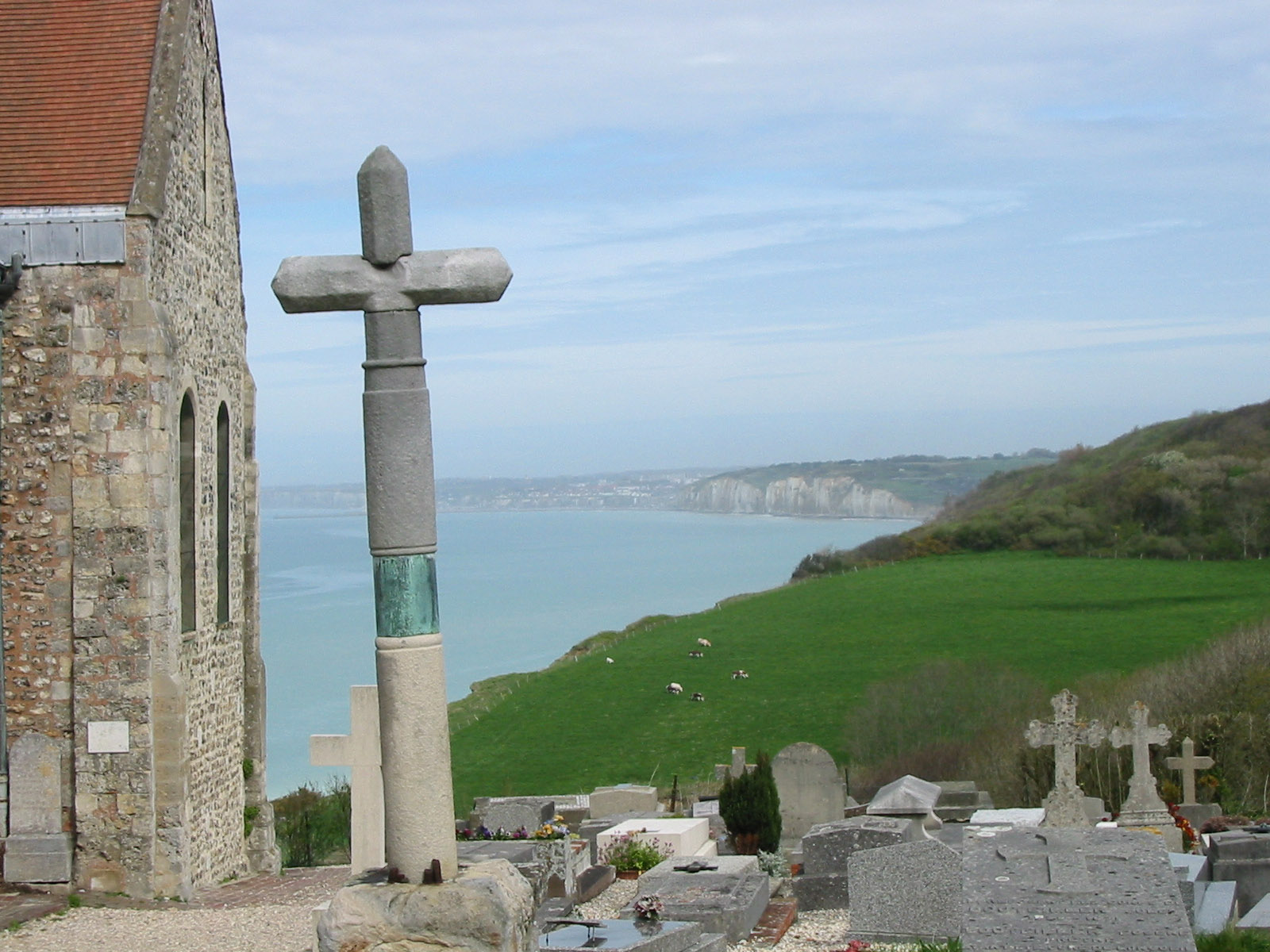
Cemetery

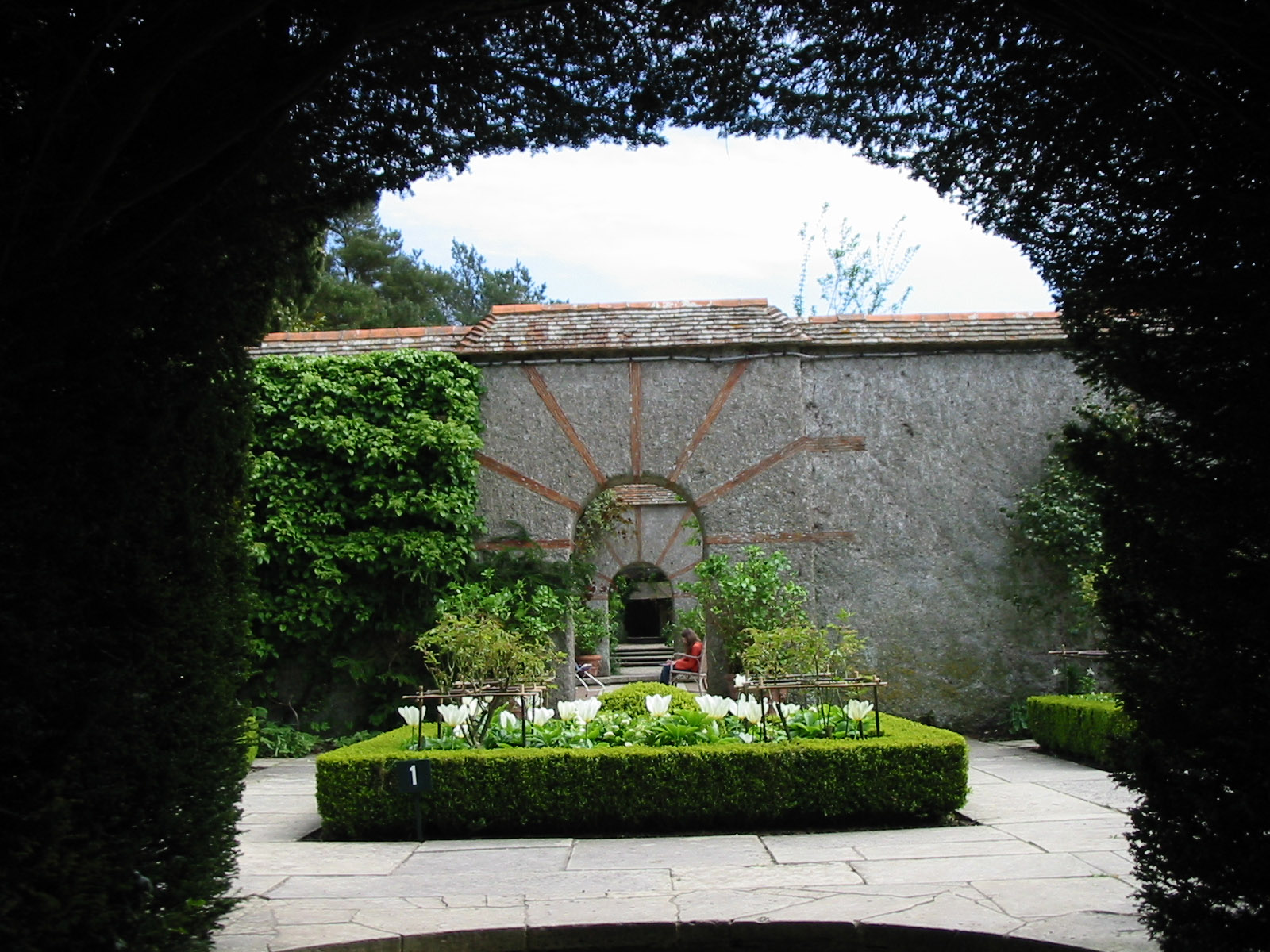
Bois des Moutiers

- Georges Braque (1883–1963), artist, buried in the cemetery
- Albert Roussel (1869–1937), composer, buried in the cemetery
- Georges de Porto-Riche (1849–1930), writer, buried in the cemetery
- Jean-Francis Auburtin (1866–1930), artist, died here
- Paul Nelson (1895–1979), architect, buried in the cemetery
- Jean Ango (1480–1551), shipping magnate and navigator, lived here
- Claude Monet (1840–1926), spent some time painting here

== Twinning ==
The village is twinned with Herstmonceux in East Sussex, in the United Kingdom

== In literature ==
Naomi Mitchison, in her autobiographic book You May Well Ask, relates that in the 1920s and 1930 she and her family, along with other families of their social circle in London, used to have vacations in Varengeville: "At the small village of Varengeville, on top of the cliffs a few miles west of Dieppe, the families with children lived in fairly basic chalets which were fine for us. We ate at the hotel and went down a steep path to the sand and rather chilly swimming, and tremendously enjoyed each other's company".

== See also ==
- Communes of the Seine-Maritime department
