= Aubermesnil-Beaumais =

- Commune
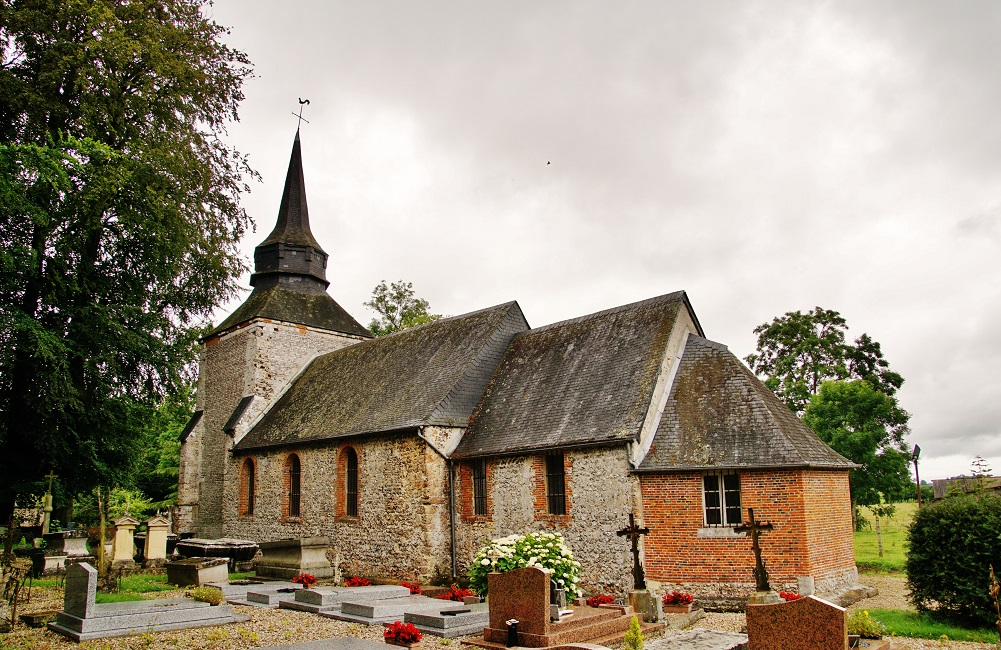
- The church in Aubermesnil-Beaumais
- Location of Aubermesnil-Beaumais
- Location within France Location within Normandy
- Coordinates: 49°51′24″N 1°07′33″E
- Country: France
- Region: Normandy
- Department: Seine-Maritime
- Arrondissement: Dieppe
- Canton: Dieppe-1
- Intercommunality: CA Région Dieppoise

Government
  - Mayor (2026–32): Isabelle Dubufresnil
- Area^{1}: 4.88 km^{2} (1.88 sq mi)
- Elevation: 100 m (330 ft)
- Highest elevation: 128 m (420 ft)
- Lowest elevation: 92 m (302 ft)
- Population (2023): 520
  - Density: 110/km^{2} (280/sq mi)
- Time zone: UTC+01:00 (CET)
  - Summer (DST): UTC+02:00 (CEST)
- INSEE/Postal code: 76030 /76550
- ^{1} French Land Register data, which excludes lakes, ponds, glaciers > 1 km^{2} (0.386 sq mi or 247 acres) and river estuaries.

Aubermesnil-Beaumais is a commune in the Seine-Maritime department in the Normandy region in northern France.

== Geography ==
A farming village in the Pays de Caux, situated some 6 miles (9.7 km) south of Dieppe, at the junction of the D915 and D100 roads.

== Population ==
Historical population
Year	Pop.	±% p.a.
1968	311	—
1975	313	+0.09%
1982	332	+0.85%
1990	408	+2.61%
1999	457	+1.27%
2007	449	−0.22%
2012	464	+0.66%
2017	468	+0.17%
2023	520	+1.77%
Source: INSEE

== Places of interest ==
- The church of St.Paul, dating from the twelfth century.
- The church of St.Laurent at Beaumais, dating from the thirteenth century.
- The château dating from the eighteenth century

== See also ==
- Communes of the Seine-Maritime department
