= Saint-Denis-d'Aclon =

- Commune
- Coat of arms
- Location of Saint-Denis-d'Aclon
- Location within France Location within Normandy
- Coordinates: 49°52′02″N 0°57′17″E
- Country: France
- Region: Normandy
- Department: Seine-Maritime
- Arrondissement: Dieppe
- Canton: Dieppe-1
- Intercommunality: CC Terroir de Caux

Government
  - Mayor (2026–32): Edouard Da Silva Alves
- Area^{1}: 2.42 km^{2} (0.93 sq mi)
- Elevation: 17 m (56 ft)
- Highest elevation: 74 m (243 ft)
- Lowest elevation: 8 m (26 ft)
- Population (2023): 130
  - Density: 54/km^{2} (140/sq mi)
- Time zone: UTC+01:00 (CET)
  - Summer (DST): UTC+02:00 (CEST)
- INSEE/Postal code: 76572 /76860
- ^{1} French Land Register data, which excludes lakes, ponds, glaciers > 1 km^{2} (0.386 sq mi or 247 acres) and river estuaries.

Saint-Denis-d'Aclon (French pronunciation: [sɛ̃ dəni daklɔ̃]) is a commune in the Seine-Maritime department in the Normandy region in north-western France.

== Geography ==
A small farming village situated by the banks of the river Saâne in the Pays de Caux, at the junction of the D27 and the D127 roads, some 7 miles (11 km) southwest of Dieppe.

== Population ==
Historical population

Year	Pop.	±% p.a.
1793	100	—
1821	101	+0.04%
1846	157	+1.78%
1872	143	−0.36%
1901	189	+0.97%
1926	183	−0.13%
1946	159	−0.70%
1962	184	+0.92%
1968	209	+2.15%

Year	Pop.	±% p.a.
1975	271	+3.78%
1982	274	+0.16%
1990	235	−1.90%
1999	196	−2.00%
2007	177	−1.27%
2012	144	−4.04%
2017	132	−1.73%
2023	130	−0.25%

Source: EHESS and INSEE (1968-2023)

== Places of interest ==
- The Saint-Denis church, dating from the nineteenth century.

== See also ==
- Communes of the Seine-Maritime department
