= Arques (river) =

River in France

- Arques drainage basin

Location
- Country: France

Physical characteristics
- Source
  - location: Pays de Caux
- Mouth
  - location: The English Channel at Dieppe
  - coordinates: 49°55′54″N 1°5′9″E
- Length: 6 km (3.7 mi)
- Basin size: 1,050 km^{2} (410 sq mi)
- Discharge
  - average: 10.2 m^{3}/s (360 cu ft/s)

The river Arques (French pronunciation: [aʁk]) is a watercourse located in the Seine-Maritime département of the Normandy region of north-western France.

Only 6 kilometres in length, the river is formed by the confluence of three rivers at Arques-la-Bataille: the Eaulne, the Béthune and the Varenne which drain the pays de Caux and the pays de Bray. The Béthune is also considered the upper part of the Arques, which is then 67 km (42 mi) long. The last part of its course takes it past the industrial zone of Rouxmesnil-Bouteilles and it then forms the waters of the port of Dieppe.

== See also ==
- French water management scheme
