= Hautot-sur-Mer =

- Commune
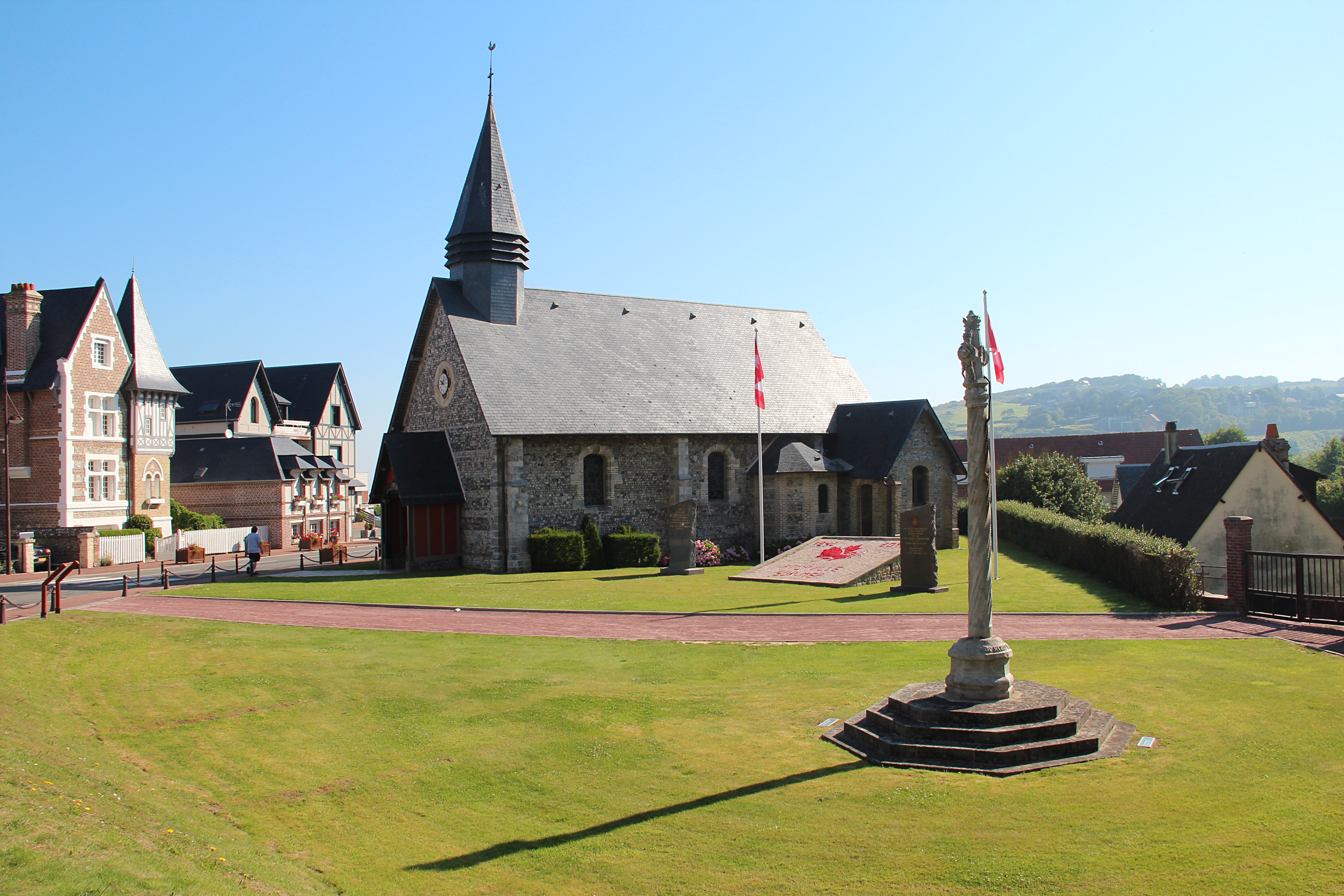
- The church of Pourville

- Coat of arms
- Location of Hautot-sur-Mer
- Location within France Location within Normandy
- Coordinates: 49°53′51″N 1°02′05″E
- Country: France
- Region: Normandy
- Department: Seine-Maritime
- Arrondissement: Dieppe
- Canton: Dieppe-1
- Intercommunality: CA de la Région Dieppoise

Government
  - Mayor (2020–2026): Jean-Jacques Brument
- Area^{1}: 9.46 km^{2} (3.65 sq mi)
- Elevation: 90 m (300 ft)
- Highest elevation: 103 m (338 ft)
- Lowest elevation: 0 m (0 ft)
- Population (2023): 1,870
  - Density: 198/km^{2} (512/sq mi)
- Time zone: UTC+01:00 (CET)
  - Summer (DST): UTC+02:00 (CEST)
- INSEE/Postal code: 76349 /76550
- ^{1} French Land Register data, which excludes lakes, ponds, glaciers > 1 km^{2} (0.386 sq mi or 247 acres) and river estuaries.

Hautot-sur-Mer (French pronunciation: [oto syʁ mɛʁ], literally Hautot on Sea) is a commune in the Seine-Maritime department in the Normandy region in northern France.

== Geography ==
A small town of farming and light industry situated in the Pays de Caux, immediately to the west of Dieppe, at the junction of the D 75, D 56 and D 925 roads. The chalk cliffs and pebble beach of the commune look out over the English Channel. The river Scie flows through the commune and to the sea at the small tourist resort of Pourville.

== History ==
The commune was formed in 1822 by the joining together of the communes of Hautot ("Hotot" in 1240), Petit-Appeville and Pourville, on the coast. It was here that a large force of Canadian soldiers came ashore during the ill-fated Dieppe Raid on 19 August 1942.

Claude Monet painted scenes in the region, including The Rocks at Pourville, Low Tide (1882), which is held by the Memorial Art Gallery at the University of Rochester in New York.

=== Heraldry ===
Arms of Hautot-sur-Mer	The arms of Hautot-sur-Mer are blazoned : Vert, a chief argent, overall a lion Or.

== Population ==
Historical population

Year	Pop.	±% p.a.
1793	520	—
1800	505	−0.42%
1806	460	−1.54%
1821	502	+0.58%
1831	829	+5.14%
1836	868	+0.92%
1841	925	+1.28%
1846	950	+0.53%
1851	930	−0.42%
1856	990	+1.26%
1861	1,068	+1.53%
1866	1,118	+0.92%
1872	1,194	+1.10%
1876	1,183	−0.23%
1881	1,310	+2.06%
1886	1,487	+2.57%
1891	1,384	−1.43%
1896	1,272	−1.67%
1901	1,342	+1.08%

Year	Pop.	±% p.a.
1906	1,483	+2.02%
1911	1,431	−0.71%
1921	1,361	−0.50%
1926	1,311	−0.75%
1931	1,419	+1.60%
1936	1,589	+2.29%
1946	1,689	+0.61%
1954	1,903	+1.50%
1962	1,639	−1.85%
1968	1,657	+0.18%
1975	1,912	+2.07%
1982	1,982	+0.51%
1990	2,111	+0.79%
1999	2,120	+0.05%
2007	1,991	−0.78%
2012	1,978	−0.13%
2017	1,914	−0.66%
2023	1,870	−0.39%

Source: EHESS and INSEE (1968-2023)

== Places of interest ==
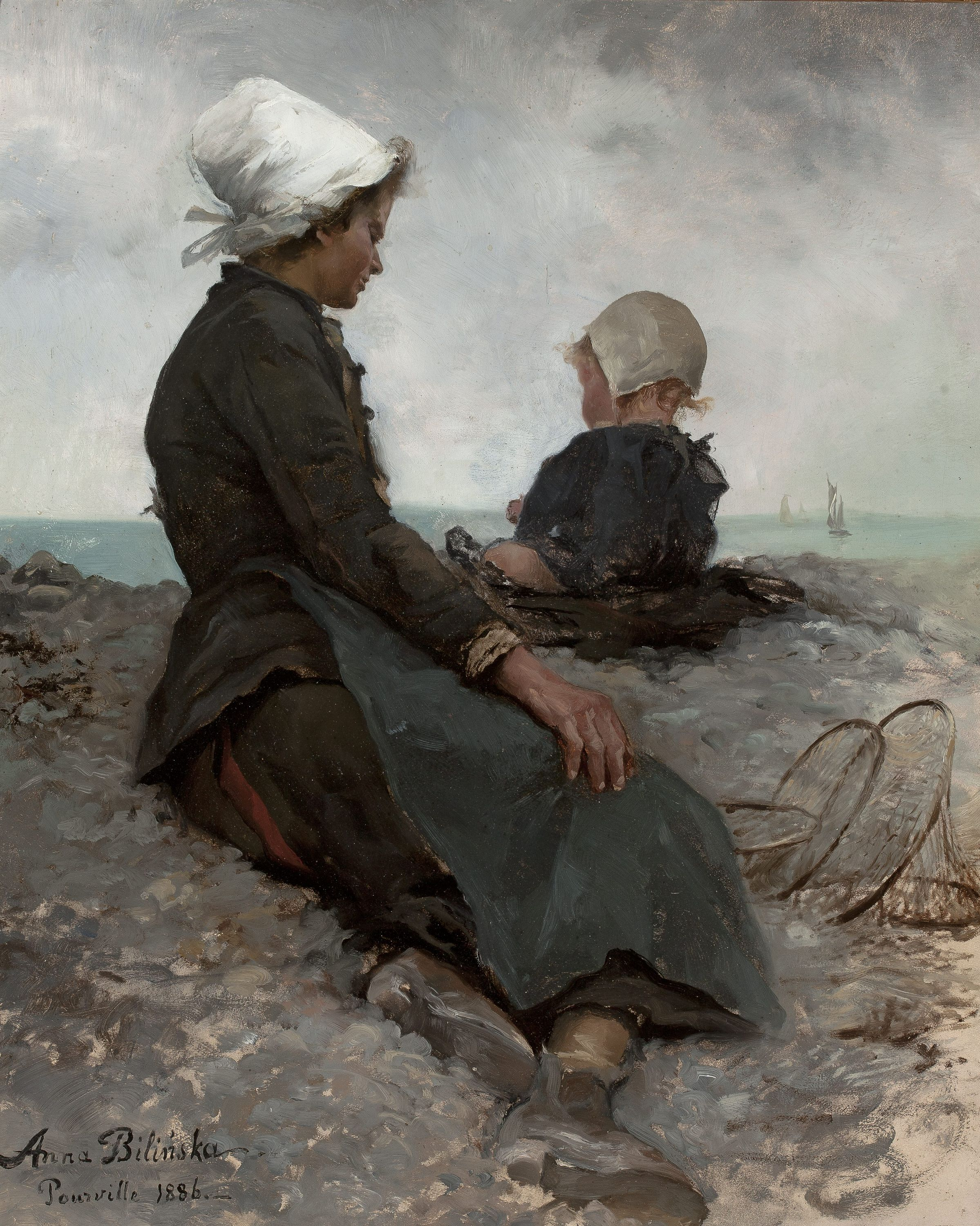
At the Seashore, painted by Anna Bilińska-Bohdanowicz at Pourville in 1886

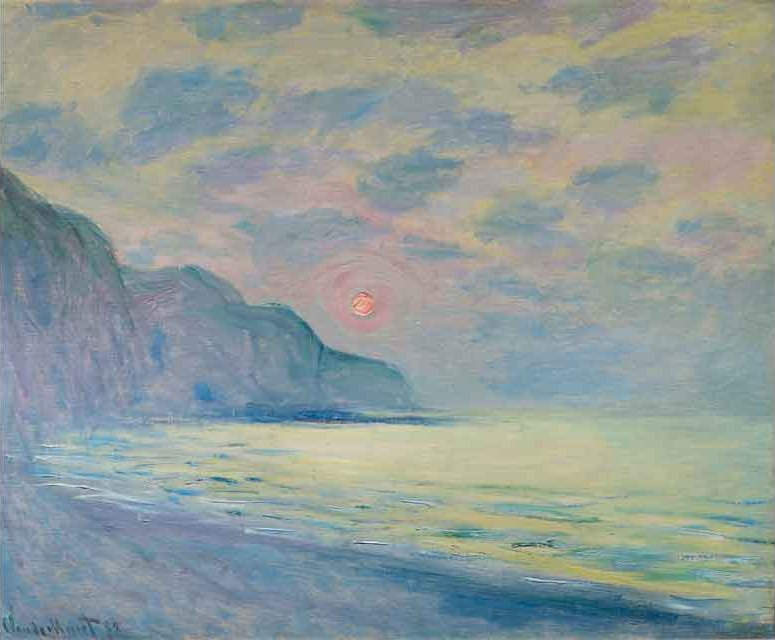
Soleil couchant, temp brumeux, Pourville by Claude Monet (1882)

- A nineteenth century château
- The ruins of a feudal castle
- A memorial to the World War II raid, built in 2002.
- The two churches of St.Remi, both dating from the sixteenth century
- The modern church at Petit-Appeville
- Two 16th-century stone crosses

== See also ==
- Communes of the Seine-Maritime department
