= Canton of Aumale =

Coordinates: 49°45′55″N 1°40′22″E

Aumale
- Former canton
- Interactive map of Aumale
- Country: France
- Region: Normandy
- Department: Seine-Maritime
- No. of communes: {{{nbcomm}}}
- Disbanded: 2015
- Area: 185.78 km^{2} (71.73 sq mi)
- Population (2012): 7,073
  - Density: 38.07/km^{2} (98.61/sq mi)

The Canton of Aumale is a former canton situated in the Seine-Maritime département and in the Haute-Normandie region of northern France. It was disbanded following the French canton reorganisation which came into effect in March 2015. It consisted of 15 communes, which joined the canton of Gournay-en-Bray in 2015. It had a total of 7,073 inhabitants (2012).

== Geography ==
An area of farming, forestry and light industry in the arrondissement of Dieppe, centred on the town of Aumale. The altitude varies from 76 m (Vieux-Rouen-sur-Bresle) to 246 m (Conteville with an average altitude of 187 m.

The canton comprised 15 communes:

- Aubéguimont
- Aumale
- Le Caule-Sainte-Beuve
- Conteville
- Criquiers
- Ellecourt
- Haudricourt
- Illois
- Landes-Vieilles-et-Neuves
- Marques
- Morienne
- Nullemont
- Richemont
- Ronchois
- Vieux-Rouen-sur-Bresle

== Population ==
Historical population Canton of Aumale
Year	1962	1968	1975	1982	1990	1999
Pop.	7,374	7,965	7,641	7,241	7,185	6,979
±%	—	+8.0%	−4.1%	−5.2%	−0.8%	−2.9%
From the year 1962 on: No double counting – residents of multiple communes (e.g. students and military personnel) are counted only once. Source: INSEE

== See also ==
- Arrondissements of the Seine-Maritime department
- Cantons of the Seine-Maritime department
- Communes of the Seine-Maritime department
