= Communauté de communes du Canton d'Aumale =

Coordinates: 49.7679°N 1.7537°E

Canton d'Aumale
- Former communauté de communes
- Interactive map of Canton d'Aumale
- Country: France
- Region: Normandy
- Department: Seine-Maritime
- No. of communes: {{{nbcomm}}}
- Established: 2002
- Disbanded: 2017
- Area: 185.78 km^{2} (71.73 sq mi)
- Population (1999): 6,979
  - Density: 37.57/km^{2} (97.30/sq mi)

The Communauté de communes du Canton d'Aumale is a former intercommunality in the Seine-Maritime département of the Normandy region of northern France. It was created in January 2002. It was merged into the new Communauté de communes interrégionale Aumale - Blangy-sur-Bresle in January 2017.

== Participants ==
The Communauté de communes comprised the following communes:

- Aubéguimont
- Aumale
- Le Caule-Sainte-Beuve
- Conteville
- Criquiers
- Ellecourt
- Haudricourt
- Illois
- Landes-Vieilles-et-Neuves
- Marques
- Morienne
- Nullemont
- Richemont
- Ronchois
- Vieux-Rouen-sur-Bresle

== See also ==
- Communes of the Seine-Maritime department
