= Coul =

Coul may refer to:

== People ==
- Cumhall (or Coul), a figure in the Fenian Cycle of Irish mythology; origin of McCool/MacCool surname
- Mackenzie baronets of Coul (1673)
- Joan Coul (14th century), daughter of Richard Coul of Hythe; wife of John Bernard (MP for Hythe)
- Suzi Coul, British politician who won in the 2019 West Oxfordshire District Council election

== Places ==
- Coul (or Coull), Ross County, Scotland, UK; see Mackenzie baronets of Coul (1673)
- Coul Links (Coul Dunes), Sutherland, Scotland, UK; a coastal dune-field
- Coul Point, Islay, Scotland, UK; see HMS Graph (P715)
- Coul House (now Coul House Hotel), Contin, Highland, Scotland, UK; a listed building in Contin
- Coul Parish, Mar, Diocese of Aberdeen, Scotland, UK
- The Coul, Balfarg, Glenrothes, Fife, Scotland, UK; a burn, a watercourse

== Other uses ==
- Coul Club, an order; see James Lumsden (Lord Provost, died 1856)

== See also ==
- "Auld King Coul", an alternate rendering of Old King Cole
- Coull (surname)
- Cole (disambiguation)
- Cool (disambiguation)
- Koul (disambiguation)
