= Caule =

Caule may refer to:

- CAULE, the EPPO code of Carthamus leucocaulos
- Le Caule-Sainte-Beuve, a commune in the Seine-Maritime department in the Normandy region in France

== See also ==
- Caul (disambiguation)
