= Illois =

Illois may refer to:

- Illois, the Finland-Swedish name of Illoinen, a district of the city of Turku, in Finland
- Illois, Seine-Maritime, a commune of the Seine-Maritime département in France
