= Coull =

Disambiguation page

Coull is a surname. Notable people with the surname include:

- Cynthia Coull (born 1965), Canadian figure skater
- Gary Coull (1954–2006), Canadian businessman
- George Coull (1862–1934), Scottish pharmaceutical chemist
- Joanna Coull (b. 1973), British swimmer
- Robert Coull (b. 1966), British cyclist

== See also ==
- Coull Castle, in Scotland
- Coull Quartet, English string quartet
- Coul (disambiguation)
