= Gary Coull =

Canadian businessman

Gary Coull (April 14, 1954 – October 26, 2006) was a co-founder and chairman of CLSA, a brokerage house specializing in Asia-Pacific stock markets.

Born in Canada, Coull graduated in 1976 from the University of British Columbia with a bachelor of arts. From 1977 to 1983, he working as a business journalist for the South China Morning Post and the Far Eastern Economic Review.

== CLSA ==
In 1983, Coull left journalism and started a small China investment and trading company. Several years later, he joined a Hong Kong brokerage firm, Winfull Laing et Cruickshank. The French bank, Crédit Lyonnais subsequently took over Laing, bought out Winfull, and created the platform for what became CLSA. In 2003, Crédit Lyonnais merged with Crédit Agricole.

Coull and a fellow journalist, Australian Jim Walker (d. 2004), co-founded CLSA in 1986. Coull was influential in attracting international investors to Asia via, for example, CLSA's annual investors' forum in Hong Kong. The annual forums in May, and since 2003 in September, included mid-week parties that featured well-known, but ageing pop stars (such as Elton John, Duran Duran or Mariah Carey), as well as sessions by former and current heads of state.

In September 2006, the magazine FinanceAsia named Coull as one of the top 50 most influential people in shaping Asia's financial landscape over the previous decade.

He mentored the careers of several prominent Asian analysts including Jing Ulrich, Douglas Clayton, and Scottish economist Jim Walker (who is not the same person as the now deceased, other co-founder of CLSA).

Coull also chaired CLSA's asset-management group, CLSA Capital Partners, whose investors include General Electric Pension Trust, Sony Life, Verizon, the German insurance group Allianz and Crédit Agricole. He was also one of the governors of the Canadian Chamber of Commerce in Hong Kong and director of the Asian Corporate Governance Association.

== Obituaries ==
On October 30, 2006, the online edition of The Times of London published a detailed biography of Coull four days after his death. The 1,200-word obituary concludes with the following:

"From Wall Street to Hong Kong, there is no dearth of brokers and economists claiming to have foreseen the economic explosion of China decades ago. Coull was among a tiny handful of those with a document to prove it: a detailed prediction of Chinese economic success long before the mainstream political or financial community had envisioned it."

In an obituary of its online edition, FinanceAsia magazine described Coull as "the charismatic 52-year-old head of Asia's only remaining true international brokerage firm." The Financial Times called Coull "a fixture of Hong Kong's financial and journalism communities for 30 years."
