= Beauvoir-en-Lyons =

- Commune
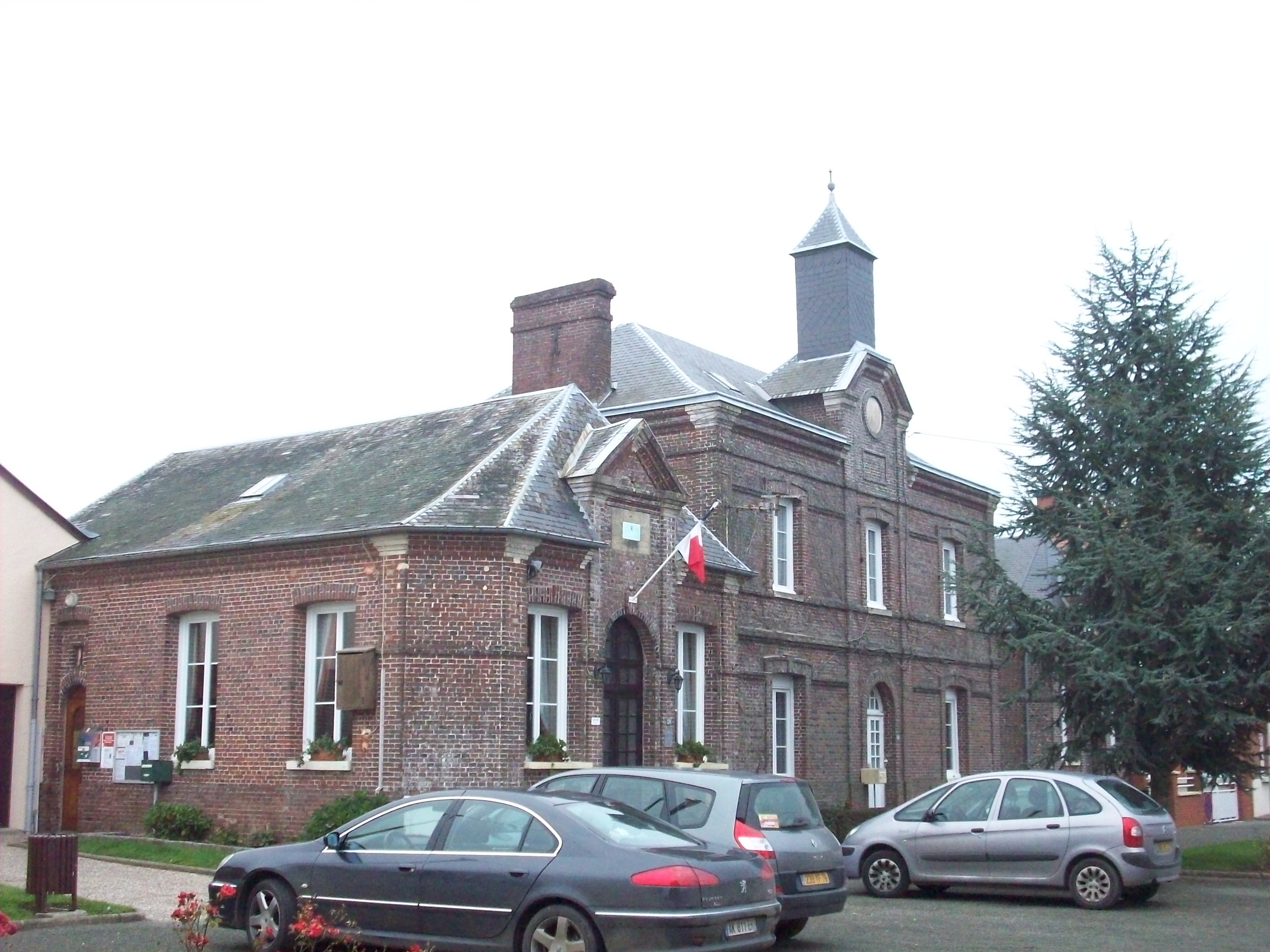
- The town hall in Beauvoir-en-Lyons
- Location of Beauvoir-en-Lyons
- Location within France Location within Normandy
- Coordinates: 49°30′14″N 1°35′13″E
- Country: France
- Region: Normandy
- Department: Seine-Maritime
- Arrondissement: Dieppe
- Canton: Gournay-en-Bray
- Intercommunality: CC 4 rivières

Government
  - Mayor (2026–32): Dominique Rimbert
- Area^{1}: 33.29 km^{2} (12.85 sq mi)
- Elevation: 248 m (814 ft)
- Highest elevation: 231 m (758 ft)
- Lowest elevation: 129 m (423 ft)
- Population (2023): 663
  - Density: 19.9/km^{2} (51.6/sq mi)
- Time zone: UTC+01:00 (CET)
  - Summer (DST): UTC+02:00 (CEST)
- INSEE/Postal code: 76067 /76220
- ^{1} French Land Register data, which excludes lakes, ponds, glaciers > 1 km^{2} (0.386 sq mi or 247 acres) and river estuaries.

Beauvoir-en-Lyons is a commune in the Seine-Maritime department in the Normandy region in northern France.

== Geography ==
A forestry and farming village situated in the Pays de Bray, some 27 miles (43 km) east of Rouen at the junction of the D1, D84 and D57 roads.

== Population ==
Historical population
| Year | Pop. | ±% p.a. |
|---|---|---|
| 1968 | 561 | — |
| 1975 | 539 | −0.57% |
| 1982 | 464 | −2.12% |
| 1990 | 463 | −0.03% |
| 1999 | 473 | +0.24% |
| 2007 | 567 | +2.29% |
| 2012 | 617 | +1.70% |
| 2017 | 617 | +0.00% |
| 2023 | 663 | +1.21% |
Source: INSEE

== Places of interest ==
- The church of St.Nicolas, dating from the eighteenth century.
- The remains of a 12th-century castle.
- Traces of the abbey of Saint-Laurent.
- The two châteaux at Bos-Hyons at Routieux.

== See also ==
- Communes of the Seine-Maritime department
