= Kaul (disambiguation) =

Kaul may refer to:

== People ==
- Kaul, a Kashmiri Pandit surname; and list of persons with that name
- Kaul Singh Thakur (born 1945), Indian politician

== Places ==
- Kaul, Kaithal, Haryana, India; a village
- Kaul Auditorium, Reed College, Portland, Oregon, USA

== Other uses ==
- KAUL (FM 106.7 MHz; 1997–2009), a radio station in Ellington, Missouri, USA
- Kabir Kaul, fictional character in the 2019 Indian film Notebook, portrayed by Zaheer Iqbal
- Vikrant Kaul, fictional character in the 2025 Indian film War 2, portrayed by Anil Kapoor

== See also ==
- Koul (disambiguation)
- Caul (disambiguation)
