= Koul (disambiguation) =

Koul or Kaul is a Kashmiri Pandit surname and list of persons with that name.

Koul may also refer to:

== People ==
- Koul Panha, an executive of the non-governmental organization COMFREL (The Committee for Free and Fair Elections in Cambodia)

== Other uses ==
- KOUL (107.7 FM), a radio station in Agua Dulce, Texas, USA
- Koul, a type of dragon from Christopher Pike's Alosha series; see List of dragons in literature

== See also ==
- Kaul (disambiguation)
- Coul (disambiguation)
