= Jing Ulrich =

American banker (born 1967)

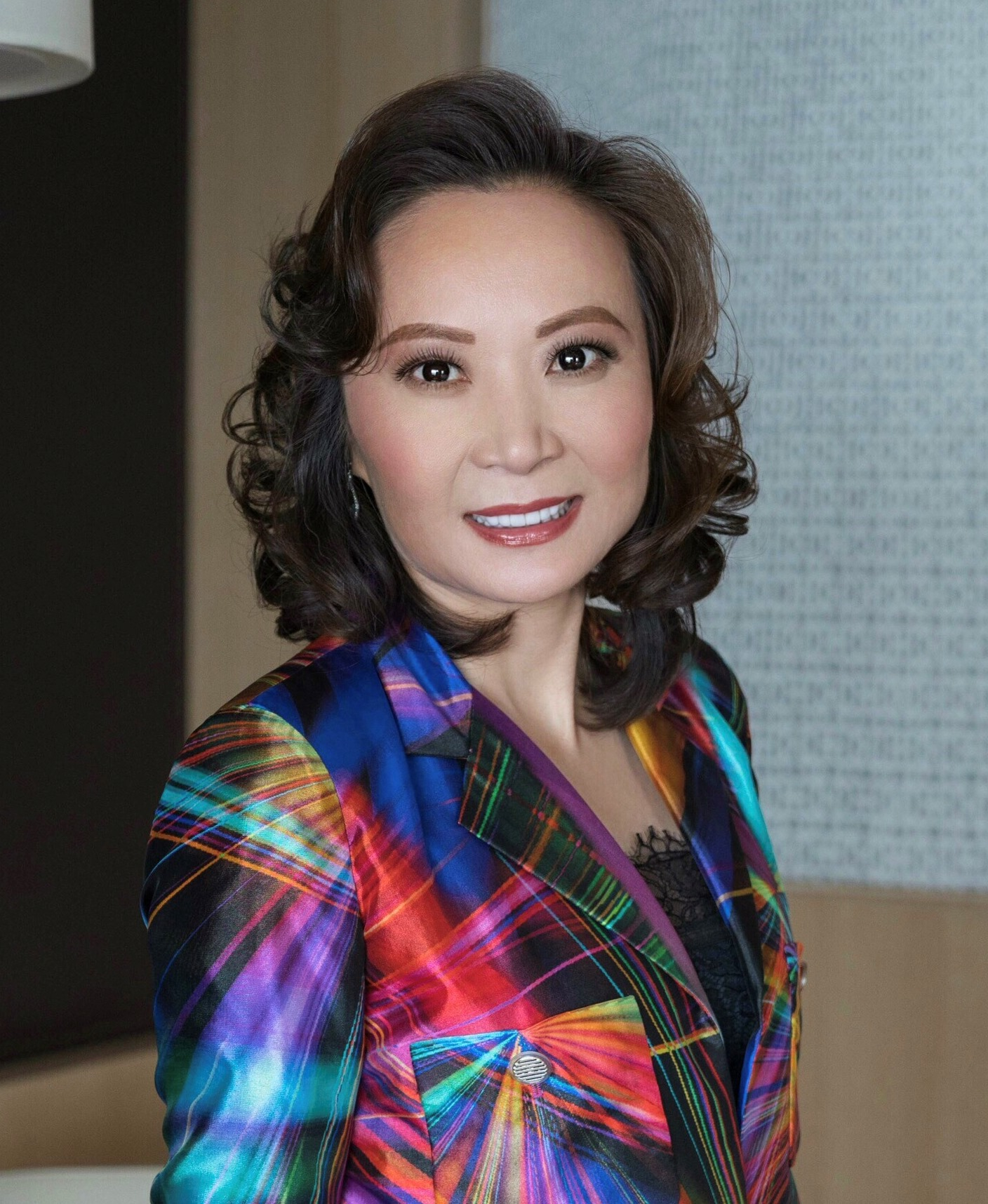
- Jing Ulrich in 2017
- Education: Harvard University (A.B.), Stanford University (M.A.)
- Known for: Ranked one of Fortune Magazine's 50 Most Powerful Global Businesswomen
- Board member of: Adidas; Swarovski; Zegna; GlaxoSmithKline

Jing Ulrich is an American financial executive and board member of public and private companies. For 21 years until July 2026, she served in various leadership positions at JPMorgan Chase as a managing director, culminating as Vice Chairman of Investment Banking.

Various publications have listed her among the world's most powerful women. For example, in 2021, for the seventh consecutive year, Forbes China ranked Ulrich among the country's top businesswomen. In October 2013, Fortune magazine for the fourth time, ranked Ulrich among the top 50 most powerful global businesswomen. Likewise, in October 2013, the South China Morning Post featured Ulrich as one of Hong Kong's 25 most inspirational and influential women. In 2016, she received the inaugural Asian Women Leadership Award from China Daily and Asia News Network.

== Education ==
In 1990, Ulrich received a bachelor's degree with honors in English and American Literature from Harvard University and in 1992 a master's degree in East Asian Studies from Stanford University.

== Career ==
=== Early career ===
From 1994 to 1996, Ulrich worked as a fund manager for Greater China at Emerging Markets Management in Washington, D.C., and before that as an equity analyst at Bankers Finance Investment.

In his 1990 autobiography, To Life: The Story of a Chicago Lawyer, the jurist Elmer Gertz, a protégé of Clarence Darrow and defender of human rights, devoted several pages to Ulrich, whom he had met when she was still a teenager.

=== Deutsche Bank ===
From 2003 to 2005, Ulrich was managing director of Greater China equities at Deutsche Bank. Before joining Deutsche Bank, Ulrich spent seven years at CLSA Asia-Pacific Markets, based in New York and Hong Kong, where she led the top-ranked team covering the region.

=== JPMorgan ===
Until July 2026, Ulrich was Vice Chairman of Investment Banking at JPMorgan, which she joined in 2005 as a Managing Director. She provides strategic advice to multinational companies across various sectors, including capital raising and other investment-banking services for transformative firms in technology, industrial, and consumer markets. Educated at Harvard and Stanford universities, Ulrich helps foster greater East-West collaboration while providing guidance on business and investment strategies for leading enterprises, private equity, and sovereign wealth funds from North America, Asia Pacific, and Europe.

Ulrich created and ran JPMorgan's China-investment summit that brought together, from forty countries, over two thousand fund managers, corporate executives, and outside experts to discuss opportunities for investing in China. Conferences run by Ulrich included keynote speeches by former officials such as Chinese premier Zhu Rongji, U.S. president Bill Clinton, Secretary of State Henry Kissinger, and UK prime minister Tony Blair.

Print and TV media have often interviewed Ulrich for her views on China. Before returning to the U.S. to focus on investment banking, she was a frequent guest on CNBC's Closing Bell investor news program. She also appeared on the PBS Nightly Business Report. In Asia she regularly spoke on Bloomberg Television. Ulrich’s views, interviews, and columns often appeared in publications such as the Financial Times, The New York Times, and The Wall Street Journal.

== Board and advisory roles ==
In October 2026, Ulrich was elected to the Board of Directors of SLB (formerly known as Schlumberger), a global energy and technology firm. In April 2026, she joined the board of Wella Company, a global beauty company owned by private equity firm KKR. Since 2019, Ulrich has been serving as a member of the Supervisory Board for the global sportswear company adidas AG. In 2024 she was appointed to the Advisory Board of Rolls-Royce Motor Cars and now also serves as brand ambassador for Rolls Royce. In 2025, Ulrich joined the Board of Directors for Swarovski, the global crystal company. From 2017 to 2025, she served on the international advisory board of the German multinational firm Bosch. Previously, Ulrich had served as an independent director on the board of GlaxoSmithKline, (GSK), a global healthcare company, on the board of Italian luxury-goods firm, Ermenegildo Zegna.

In addition, Ulrich served on the Strategy Advisory Board of private equity firm L. Catterton, on the China Advisory Panel of real-estate company CapitaLand, and on the International Advisory Council of Bocconi University in Italy. From 2016 to 2020, Ulrich was also a member of the trade-and-investment task force of the B20 / G20 member states, and a member of the International Chamber of Commerce G20 CEO Advisory Group, which is the main forum for guiding business input into the G20 process. From 2014 to 2018 she served on the Asia Pacific Economic Cooperation (APEC) China Business Council Multinational Advisory Committee.

== Accolades ==
In October 2006, the South China Morning Post and the American Chamber of Commerce in Hong Kong had chosen Ulrich as Hong Kong's Young Achiever of the Year from among several hundred nominees.

An annual poll of institutional investors, published in June 2007, ranked Ulrich as head of the top China team worldwide – a title she held five times, according to Institutional Investor magazine in June 2007, which put a photo of Ulrich on the cover of its international edition of that issue. Until she moved into a more senior role, global investors in independent research polls of other publications such as Asiamoney magazine repeatedly chose her as the best China strategist.

In 2010 and 2011 Fortune magazine named Jing Ulrich as one of the 50 most powerful global business women, while the October 2010 and August 2008 editions of Forbes magazine put Ulrich on Forbes's list of the 100 most powerful women in the world., with the more recent Forbes publication also including her among the world's "20 youngest power women". In 2011 and 2012, FinanceAsia named Ulrich one of the top 20 women in finance and top 30 bankers in China. In March 2012 and 2013, Forbes magazine named her one of Asia's top 50 powerful businesswomen.

As of 2012 the South China Morning Post, China Daily, and others have referred to Ulrich as the "Oprah Winfrey of the investment world".

== Personal ==
Ulrich is a U.S. citizen and bilingual in Mandarin and English.
