= List of listed buildings in Contin, Highland =

This is a list of listed buildings in the parish of Contin in Highland, Scotland.

== List ==
Name	Location	Date listed	Grid ref. (Note: Sometimes known as OSGB36, the grid reference (where provided) is based on the British national grid reference system used by the Ordnance Survey. • "Guide to National Grid". Ordnance Survey. • "Get-a-map". Ordnance Survey.)	Geo-coordinates	Notes	LB number (Note: Historic Environment Scotland assign a unique alphanumeric identifier to each designated site in Scotland, for listed buildings this always begins with "LB", for example "LB12345".)	Image
Coul House Hotel Formerly Coul House				57°34′17″N 4°34′21″W	Category A	1769	Upload another image See more images
Kinlochluichart Old Manse And Steading				57°37′19″N 4°49′10″W	Category C(S)	1775	Upload Photo
Strathconon Church Of Scotland Parish Church				57°32′33″N 4°51′19″W	Category B	1781	Upload another image See more images
Contin Parish Church (Church Of Scotland) And Burial Ground				57°33′56″N 4°34′57″W	Category B	1790	Upload another image
Coul House Hotel West Lodge				57°34′08″N 4°34′47″W	Category C(S)	1770	Upload Photo
Jamestown, Former Free Church Manse				57°34′25″N 4°32′42″W	Category B	1772	Upload Photo
Kinellan Farm				57°34′55″N 4°33′09″W	Category C(S)	1773	Upload another image
Scatwell House Community Centre Cottages And Walled Garden				57°33′53″N 4°40′42″W	Category C(S)	1778	Upload another image
Conon Valley Hydro Electric Scheme, Vaich Dam, Including Spillway Towers And Weir				57°44′02″N 4°46′46″W	Category C(S)	51707	Upload another image
Contin Manse (Church Of Scotland)				57°33′52″N 4°34′50″W	Category C(S)	1768	Upload another image
Kinlochluichart Church Of Scotland And Burial Ground				57°37′21″N 4°49′14″W	Category B	1774	Upload another image See more images
Lochroisque Old Lodge				57°34′42″N 5°05′46″W	Category C(S)	1777	Upload Photo
Conon Valley, Hydro Electric Scheme, Achanalt Power Station And Dam, Including Fish Pass				57°36′57″N 4°49′58″W	Category C(S)	51705	Upload Photo
Strathconon Former Church Of Scotland Manse				57°32′36″N 4°51′15″W	Category B	1782	Upload Photo
Strathconon Bridge Over River Meig At Bridgend				57°33′12″N 4°48′18″W	Category B	1780	Upload Photo
Achnasheen. Ledgowan Bridge Over River Bran				57°34′40″N 5°04′54″W	Category B	1788	Upload another image
Contin Bridge Over River Black Water				57°34′25″N 4°35′12″W	Category A	1789	Upload another image
Conon Valley Hydro Electric Scheme, Loch Glascarnoch Dam				57°41′45″N 4°46′39″W	Category B	51706	Upload another image See more images
Mains Of Coul				57°34′12″N 4°34′22″W	Category B	1771	Upload another image
Scatwell House Main Gate Lodge. Gate Piers And Gates				57°33′46″N 4°40′31″W	Category C(S)	1779	Upload Photo

== Key ==
The scheme for classifying buildings in Scotland is:

- Category A: "buildings of national or international importance, either architectural or historic; or fine, little-altered examples of some particular period, style or building type."
- Category B: "buildings of regional or more than local importance; or major examples of some particular period, style or building type, which may have been altered."
- Category C: "buildings of local importance; lesser examples of any period, style, or building type, as originally constructed or moderately altered; and simple traditional buildings which group well with other listed buildings."

In March 2016 there were 47,288 listed buildings in Scotland. Of these, 8% were Category A, and 50% were Category B, with the remaining 42% being Category C.

== See also ==
- List of listed buildings in Highland
