= 2019 West Oxfordshire District Council election =

2019 UK local government election

Results of the 2019 West Oxfordshire District Council election

The 2019 West Oxfordshire District Council election took place on 2 May 2019 to elect members of West Oxfordshire District Council in Oxfordshire, England. One third of the council was up for election and the Conservative Party stayed in overall control of the council.

After the election, the composition of the council was:

- Conservative 28
- Liberal Democrats 10
- Labour 9
- Independent 2

== Election result ==
West Oxfordshire local election result 2019
Party	Seats	Gains	Losses	Net gain/loss	Seats %	Votes %	Votes	+/−
Conservative	8	0	7	-7	50.0	39.1	7,991	-14.5%
Labour	4	4	0	+4	25.0	23.0	4,697	+5.5%
Liberal Democrats	3	2	0	+2	18.75	24.3	4,975	+13.9%
Green	0	0	0	0	0	9.0	1,841	-0.5%
Independent	1	1	0	+1	6.25	4.0	813	+4.0%
UKIP	0	0	0	0	0	0.6	131	-8.4%

== Ward results ==
Alvescot and Filkins
Party	Candidate	Votes	%	±%
Conservative	Suzi Coul	248	49.0	−17.4
Liberal Democrats	Elizabeth Anne Mortimer	106	20.9	+14.4
Labour	Moira Christine Swann	96	19.0	+9.6
Green	Alma Ann Tumilowicz	56	11.1	+2.9
Majority		142	28.1	−28.8
Turnout		506	36.5	−37.8
Conservative hold		Swing		

Bampton and Clanfield
Party	Candidate	Votes	%	±%
Conservative	Ted Fenton	659	62.7	+3.3
Liberal Democrats	Andrew Robert Goodwin	278	26.5	+18.1
Labour	Sian Priscilla Florence O'Neill	114	10.8	+1.1
Majority		381	36.3	−10.3
Turnout		1051	34.6	−40.7
Conservative hold		Swing		

Carterton North East
Party	Candidate	Votes	%	±%
Conservative	Norman Alexander MacRae	470	59.8	+0.1
Green	Rosie Pearson	126	16.0	+10.9
Labour	Calvert Charles Stuart McGibbon	104	13.2	−0.9
Liberal Democrats	Ivan Aguado Melet	86	10.9	+4.9
Majority		344	43.8	−2.8
Turnout		786	20.5	−43.8
Conservative hold		Swing		

Carterton North West
Party	Candidate	Votes	%	±%
Conservative	Jill Pamela Bull	375	39.9	−21.6
Independent	Pete Handley	350	37.2	+37.2
Labour	Dave Wesson	108	11.5	+0.0
Liberal Democrats	Andy Crick	107	11.4	+5.4
Majority		25	2.7	−43.4
Turnout		940	24.9	−42.5
Conservative hold		Swing		

Carterton South
Party	Candidate	Votes	%	±%
Conservative	Michele Louise Mead	485	57.8	−2.2
UKIP	Desmond Clewes	131	15.6	−1.1
Liberal Democrats	Christopher John Blount	113	13.5	+8.2
Labour	Marion Louise Harley	110	13.1	+0.9
Majority		354	42.2	−1.0
Turnout		839	23.7	−44.0
Conservative hold		Swing		

Charlbury and Finstock
Party	Candidate	Votes	%	±%
Liberal Democrats	Andy Graham	666	45.6	+2.4
Conservative	Philippa Hannah Phelan	445	30.5	+3.0
Green	Liz Reason	231	15.8	+5.0
Labour	Sue Richards	118	8.1	+0.8
Majority		221	15.1	+5.4
Turnout		1460	48.7	−28.8
Liberal Democrats hold		Swing		

Chipping Norton
Party	Candidate	Votes	%	±%
Labour	Mike Cahill	766	40.5	+14.7
Conservative	Jonny Rosemont	631	33.4	−18.5
Liberal Democrats	Juliet Elizabeth Anson	495	26.2	+20.9
Majority		135	7.1	N/A
Turnout		1892	37.9	−35.4
Labour gain from Conservative		Swing		

Eynsham and Cassington
Party	Candidate	Votes	%	±%
Liberal Democrats	Dan Levy	1,005	53.0	+34.3
Conservative	Peter David Kelland	442	23.3	−18.3
Green	Helen Gavin	300	15.8	+2.2
Labour	Judith Frances Wardle	148	7.8	−7.5
Majority		563	29.7	N/A
Turnout		1895	39.7	−35.0
Liberal Democrats gain from Conservative		Swing		

Hailey, Minster Lovell and Leafield
Party	Candidate	Votes	%	±%
Conservative	Gillian Rosalind Hill	567	46.0	−10.0
Liberal Democrats	Gabriel William Jonathan Schenk	402	32.6	+18.5
Labour	Gavin John Hyatt	133	10.8	−5.2
Green	Frances Mortimer	130	10.6	−3.4
Majority		165	13.4	−28.5
Turnout		1232	39.2	−36.8
Conservative hold		Swing		

Kingham, Rollright and Enstone
Party	Candidate	Votes	%	±%
Conservative	Andrew Clive Beaney	571	52.9	−7.8
Green	Celia Jocelyn Kerslake	190	17.6	+9.5
Liberal Democrats	Mike Baggaley	174	16.1	+7.8
Labour	Steve Akers	145	13.4	−0.9
Majority		381	35.3	−11.1
Turnout		1080	34.0	−38.3
Conservative hold		Swing		

Stonesfield and Tackley
Party	Candidate	Votes	%	±%
Liberal Democrats	Nathalie Claire Anne Chapple	648	45.7	+33.9
Conservative	Charles Cottrell-Dormer	485	34.2	−23.5
Green	Mathew Parkinson	182	12.8	−0.5
Labour	David John Baldwin	103	7.3	−9.8
Majority		163	11.5	N/A
Turnout		1418	44.3	−34.4
Liberal Democrats gain from Conservative		Swing		

Witney Central
Party	Candidate	Votes	%	±%
Labour	Luci Ashbourne	602	47.3	+15.6
Conservative	Craig Brown	452	35.5	−10.5
Green	Stuart MacDonald	125	9.8	+2.0
Liberal Democrats	Mark Mann	94	7.4	+1.6
Majority		150	11.8	N/A
Turnout		1273	33.4	−33.3
Labour gain from Conservative		Swing		

Witney East
Party	Candidate	Votes	%	±%
Labour	Joy Aitman	1,020	50.5	+26.4
Conservative	Dean Temple	717	35.5	−18.4
Liberal Democrats	Gilly Workman	283	14.0	+9.7
Majority		303	15.0	N/A
Turnout		2020	35.9	−39.5
Labour gain from Conservative		Swing		

Witney North
Party	Candidate	Votes	%	±%
Independent	Richard Andrew Langridge	463	35.7	+35.7
Conservative	Andy McMahon	305	23.5	−26.1
Labour	Trevor Ian License	276	21.3	+2.7
Green	Andrew Peter Prosser	168	13.0	−1.3
Liberal Democrats	William Harry Griffiths	84	6.5	+0.5
Majority		158	12.2	N/A
Turnout		1296	41.3	−28.8
Independent gain from Conservative		Swing		

Witney South
Party	Candidate	Votes	%	±%
Labour	Owen Gregory Blase Collins	637	40.8	+18.8
Conservative	Alvin Jon Adams	585	37.5	−9.7
Green	Carol Rae Cather	228	14.6	+6.8
Liberal Democrats	Edward Mortimer	110	7.1	+1.7
Majority		52	3.3	N/A
Turnout		1560	33.0	−34.4
Labour gain from Conservative		Swing		

Witney West
Party	Candidate	Votes	%	±%
Conservative	Harry Brian Eaglestone	554	46.2	−15.1
Liberal Democrats	Derek George Laud	324	27.0	+20.2
Labour	Ian Bradley Moore	217	18.1	+3.8
Green	Sandra Mary Simpson	105	8.8	+2.2
Majority		230	19.2	−27.8
Turnout		1200	34.4	−36.1
Conservative hold		Swing		
