= Caul (disambiguation) =

Caul may refer to:

- Caul, a thin, filmy membrane that covers or partly covers a newborn mammal immediately after birth
- Caul (headgear), a historical headdress worn by women that covers tied-up hair
- Caul fat, the membrane around food animals' internal organs
- A curved batten, usually used in pairs for applying even pressure across wide workpieces
- In woodworking, a strip or block of wood used to distribute or direct clamping force
- Term for greater omentum in animals

== See also ==
- Caule (disambiguation)
- Cauls Pond, Anguilla; a wetland
- Kaul (disambiguation)
