= Mackenzie baronets of Coul (1673) =

Escutcheon of the Mackenzie baronets of Coul

The Mackenzie baronetcy, of Coul (Coull) in the County of Ross, was created in the Baronetage of Nova Scotia on 16 October 1673 for Kenneth Mackenzie. His father Alexander Mackenzie of Coul was the illegitimate son of Colin Cam Mackenzie, 11th of Kintail, and half-brother of Kenneth Mackenzie, 1st Lord Mackenzie of Kintail, ancestor of the Earls of Seaforth, and of Sir Roderick Mackenzie, ancestor of the Earls of Cromarty. The 3rd Baronet was involved in the Jacobite rising of 1715. He was attainted with the baronetcy forfeited.

The baronetcy has since been assumed by descendants of the brother of the 3rd Baronet. The Official Roll of the Baronetage marks the baronetcy as dormant.

== Mackenzie baronets, of Coul (1673) ==
- Sir Kenneth Mackenzie, 1st Baronet (c. 1620-c. 1680)
- Sir Alexander Mackenzie, 2nd Baronet (died 1702)
- Sir John Mackenzie, 3rd Baronet (c. 1673-c. 1715)

== Extended family ==
It has been claimed that the attainder did not apply to collateral branches. Assumed titles in the baronetcy are recorded in standard sources.

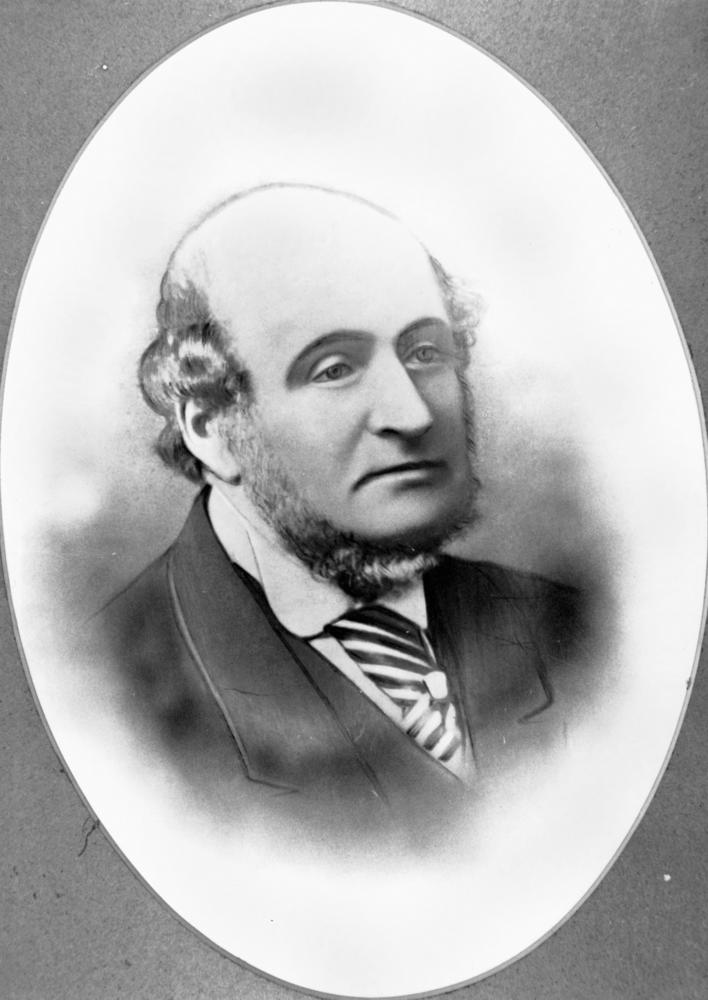
Sir Robert Mackenzie, 10th Baronet, of Coul

- Sir Colin Mackenzie, 4th Baronet (1674–1740)
- Sir Alexander Mackenzie, 5th Baronet (died 1792)
- Sir Alexander Mackenzie, 6th Baronet (died 1796)
- Sir George Steuart Mackenzie, 7th Baronet (1780–1848)
- Sir Alexander Mackenzie, 8th Baronet (1805–1856)
- Sir William Mackenzie, 9th Baronet (1806–1868)
- Sir Robert Ramsay Mackenzie, 10th Baronet (1811–1873)
- Sir Arthur George Ramsay Mackenzie, 11th Baronet (1865–1935)
- Sir Robert Evelyn Mackenzie, 12th Baronet (1906–1990)
- Peter Douglas Mackenzie, presumed 13th Baronet (1949–2021). Not on the Official Roll.
- Miles Roderick Turing Mackenzie, presumed 14th Baronet (b. 1952), is a kinsman of the 13th Baronet.
