= Richemont, Seine-Maritime =

Richemont
- Commune
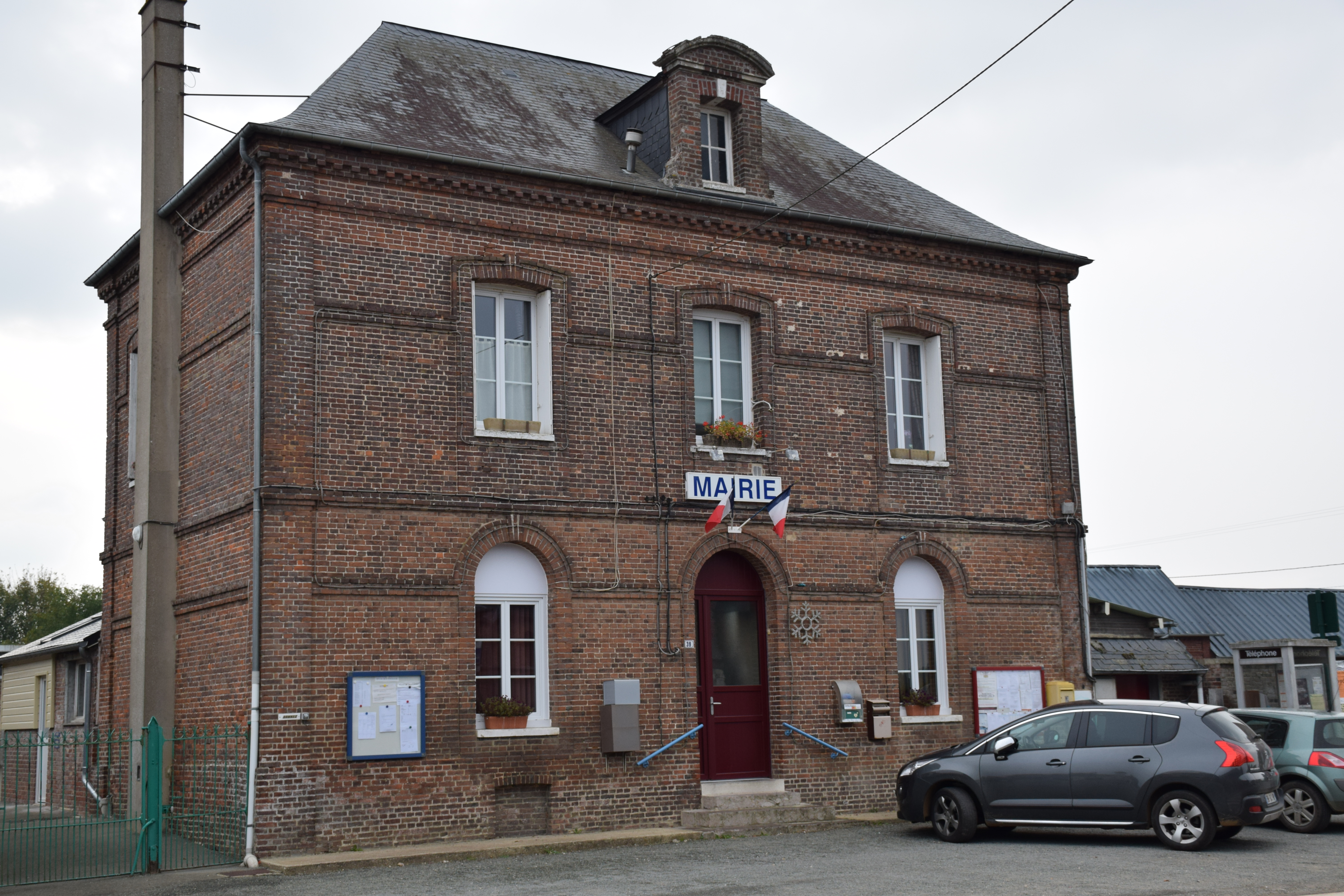
- The town hall in Richemont
- Location of Richemont
- Location within France Location within Normandy
- Coordinates: 49°48′34″N 1°38′44″E
- Country: France
- Region: Normandy
- Department: Seine-Maritime
- Arrondissement: Dieppe
- Canton: Gournay-en-Bray
- Intercommunality: CC Aumale - Blangy-sur-Bresle

Government
  - Mayor (2021–2026): Marylène Paul
- Area^{1}: 10.69 km^{2} (4.13 sq mi)
- Elevation: 206 m (676 ft)
- Highest elevation: 221 m (725 ft)
- Lowest elevation: 152 m (499 ft)
- Population (2023): 445
  - Density: 41.6/km^{2} (108/sq mi)
- Time zone: UTC+01:00 (CET)
  - Summer (DST): UTC+02:00 (CEST)
- INSEE/Postal code: 76527 /76390
- ^{1} French Land Register data, which excludes lakes, ponds, glaciers > 1 km^{2} (0.386 sq mi or 247 acres) and river estuaries.

Richemont (French pronunciation: [ʁiʃmɔ̃]) is a commune in the Seine-Maritime department in the Normandy region in northern France.

It was the namesake for Richmond, North Yorkshire in England, which was itself the namesake for many other places around the world such as Richmond, Virginia in the United States.

== Geography ==
A forestry and farming village situated in the Pays de Bray at the junction of the D60 with the D920 road, some 28 miles (45 km) southeast of Dieppe.

== Population ==
Historical population
Year	Pop.	±% p.a.
1968	478	—
1975	459	−0.58%
1982	461	+0.06%
1990	450	−0.30%
1999	447	−0.07%
2007	471	+0.66%
2012	483	+0.50%
2017	453	−1.27%
2023	445	−0.30%
Source: INSEE

== Places of interest ==
- The church of St. Michel, dating from the thirteenth century.

== See also ==
- Communes of the Seine-Maritime department
