= Landes-Vieilles-et-Neuves =

- Commune
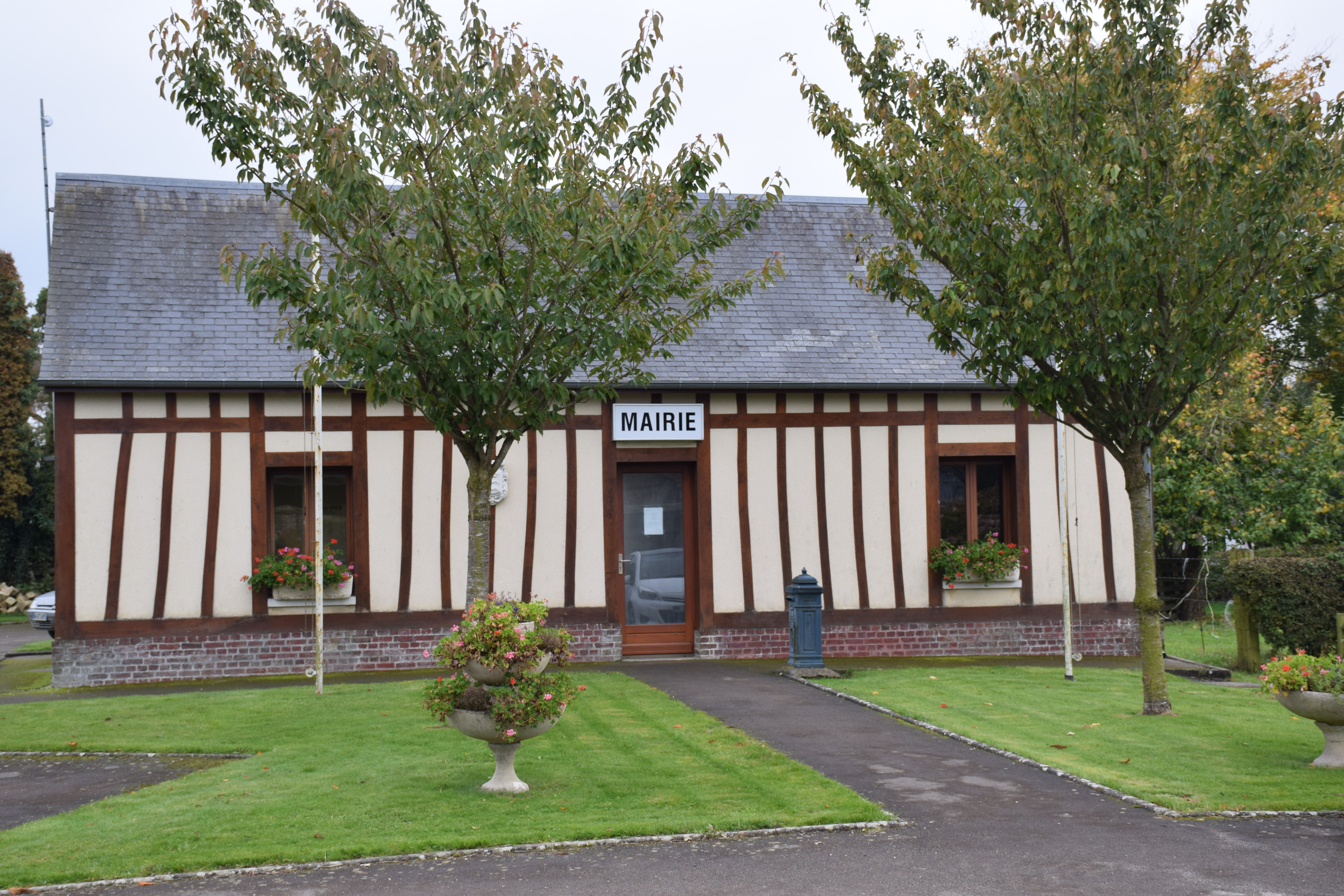
- The town hall in Landes-Vieilles-et-Neuves
- Location of Landes-Vieilles-et-Neuves
- Location within France Location within Normandy
- Coordinates: 49°47′16″N 1°37′49″E
- Country: France
- Region: Normandy
- Department: Seine-Maritime
- Arrondissement: Dieppe
- Canton: Gournay-en-Bray
- Intercommunality: CC Aumale - Blangy-sur-Bresle

Government
  - Mayor (2020–2026): Christine Moreau
- Area^{1}: 7.09 km^{2} (2.74 sq mi)
- Elevation: 210 m (690 ft)
- Highest elevation: 230 m (750 ft)
- Lowest elevation: 169 m (554 ft)
- Population (2023): 125
  - Density: 17.6/km^{2} (45.7/sq mi)
- Time zone: UTC+01:00 (CET)
  - Summer (DST): UTC+02:00 (CEST)
- INSEE/Postal code: 76381 /76390
- ^{1} French Land Register data, which excludes lakes, ponds, glaciers > 1 km^{2} (0.386 sq mi or 247 acres) and river estuaries.

Landes-Vieilles-et-Neuves (French pronunciation: [lɑ̃d vjɛj e nœv]) is a commune in the Seine-Maritime department in the Normandy region in northern France.

== Geography ==
Landes-Vieilles-et-Neuves is a small farming village with four hamlets, situated in the Pays de Bray, some 45 kilometres (28 mi) southeast of Dieppe at the junction of the D82 and the D7 roads.

== Population ==
Historical population
Year	Pop.	±% p.a.
1968	149	—
1975	147	−0.19%
1982	105	−4.69%
1990	148	+4.38%
1999	132	−1.26%
2007	126	−0.58%
2012	136	+1.54%
2017	137	+0.15%
2023	125	−1.52%
Source: INSEE

== Places of interest ==
- The chapel of St.Marguerite at Vieilles-Landes.
- The church of St.Lambert at Landes-Neuves, dating from the sixteenth century.

== See also ==
- Communes of the Seine-Maritime department
