= Haudricourt =

- Commune
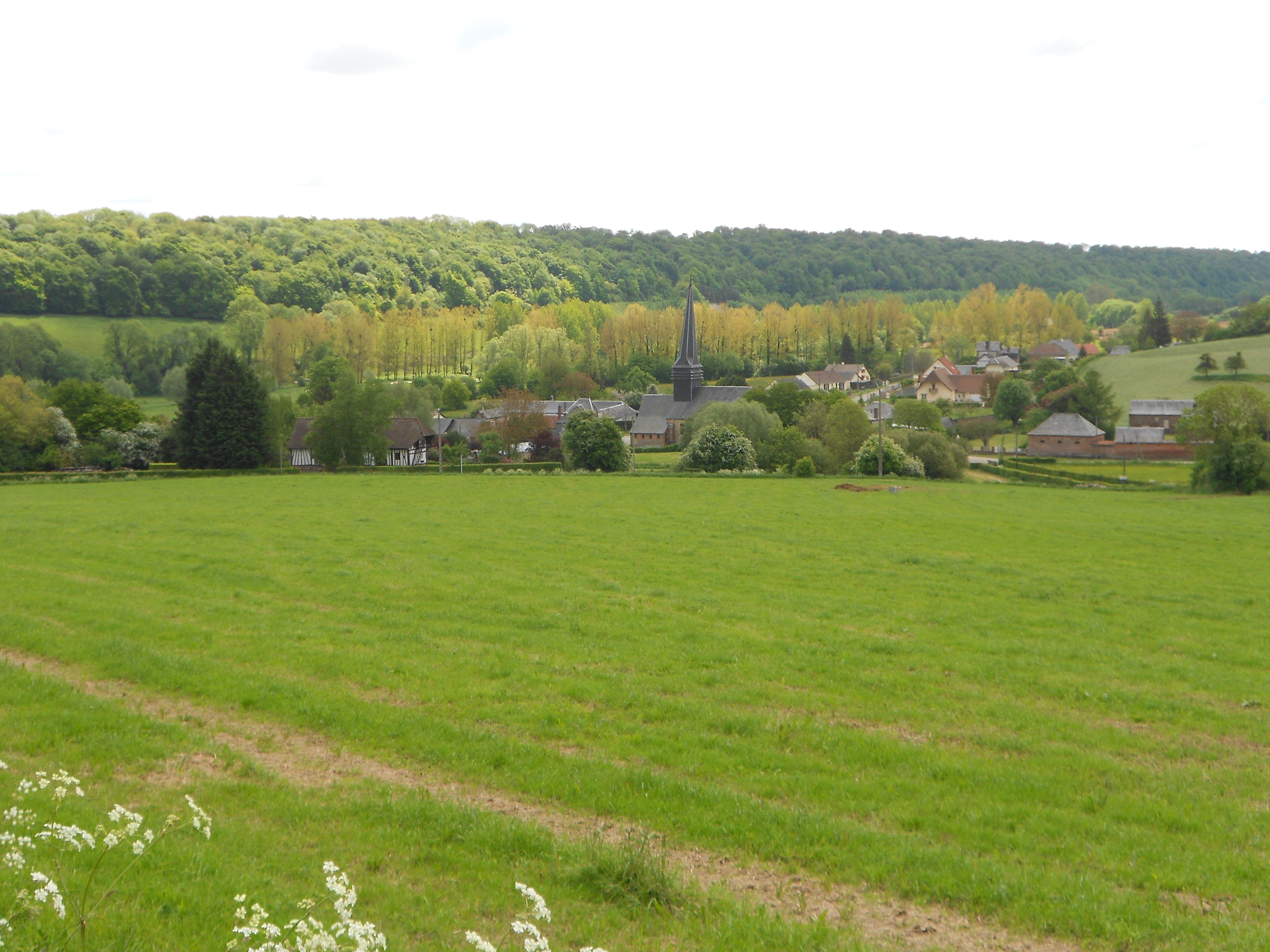
- A general view of Haudricourt
- Location of Haudricourt
- Location within France Location within Normandy
- Coordinates: 49°44′03″N 1°42′21″E
- Country: France
- Region: Normandy
- Department: Seine-Maritime
- Arrondissement: Dieppe
- Canton: Gournay-en-Bray
- Intercommunality: CC Aumale - Blangy-sur-Bresle

Government
  - Mayor (2026–32): Véronique Boutin
- Area^{1}: 29.98 km^{2} (11.58 sq mi)
- Elevation: 146 m (479 ft)
- Highest elevation: 240 m (790 ft)
- Lowest elevation: 125 m (410 ft)
- Population (2023): 461
  - Density: 15.4/km^{2} (39.8/sq mi)
- Time zone: UTC+01:00 (CET)
  - Summer (DST): UTC+02:00 (CEST)
- INSEE/Postal code: 76344 /76390
- ^{1} French Land Register data, which excludes lakes, ponds, glaciers > 1 km^{2} (0.386 sq mi or 247 acres) and river estuaries.

Haudricourt (French pronunciation: [odʁikuʁ]) is a commune in the Seine-Maritime department in the Normandy region in northern France.

== Geography ==
A farming village situated in the Pays de Bray, some 42 miles (68 km) southeast of Dieppe at the junction of the D9 and D436 roads. The commune borders the département of Oise.

== Population ==
Historical population
| Year | Pop. | ±% p.a. |
|---|---|---|
| 1968 | 538 | — |
| 1975 | 491 | −1.30% |
| 1982 | 456 | −1.05% |
| 1990 | 443 | −0.36% |
| 1999 | 443 | +0.00% |
| 2007 | 455 | +0.33% |
| 2012 | 470 | +0.65% |
| 2017 | 416 | −2.41% |
| 2023 | 461 | +1.73% |
Source: INSEE

== Places of interest ==
- A sixteenth century manorhouse at Beaufrêne
- The church of St.Jean & St.Martin, dating from the eleventh century.
- The church of Notre-Dame, dating from the sixteenth century.
- The church of St.Pierre, dating from the eighteenth century.

== See also ==
- Communes of the Seine-Maritime department
