= Conteville, Seine-Maritime =

Conteville
- Commune
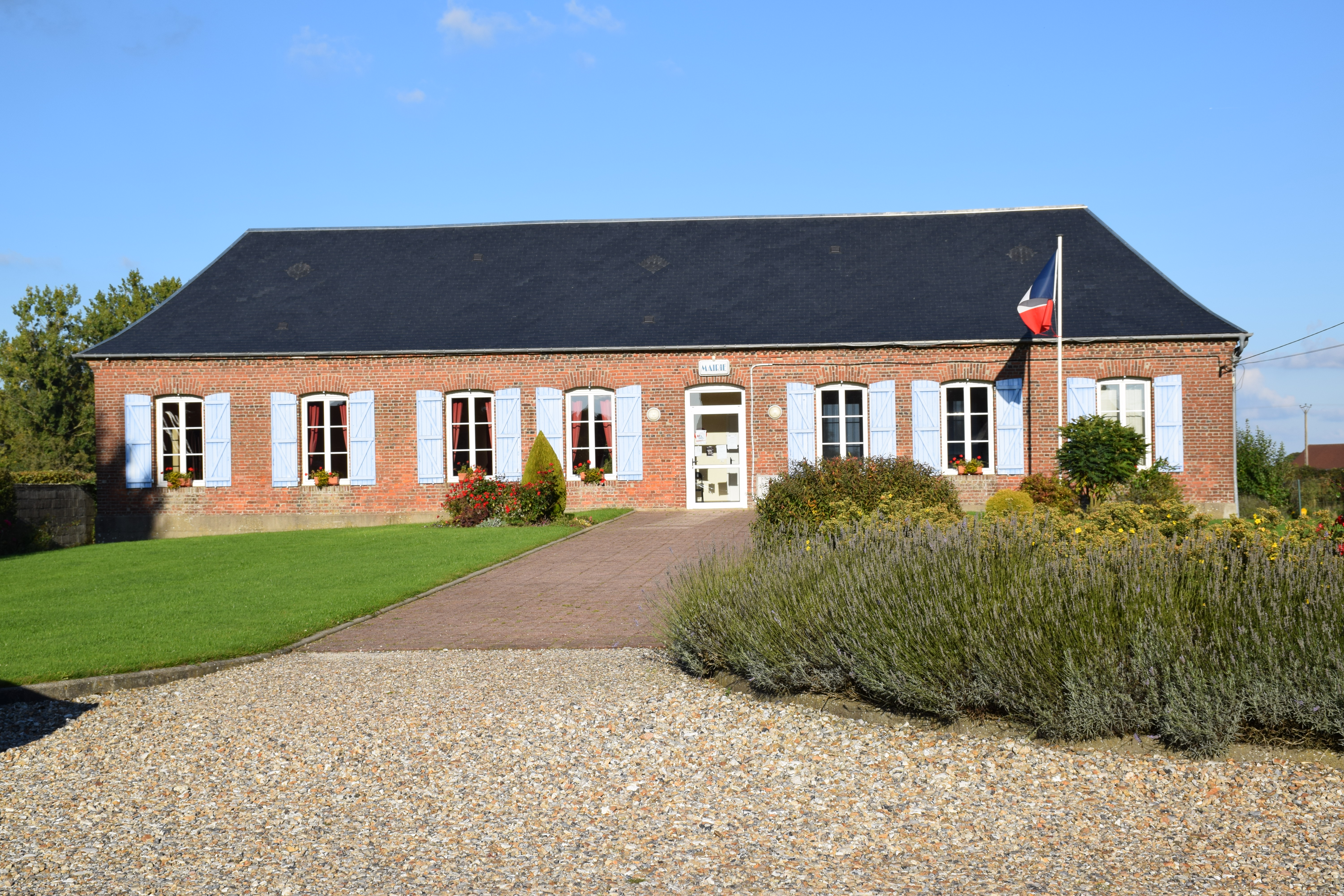
- The town hall in Conteville
- Location of Conteville
- Location within France Location within Normandy
- Coordinates: 49°41′42″N 1°38′06″E
- Country: France
- Region: Normandy
- Department: Seine-Maritime
- Arrondissement: Dieppe
- Canton: Gournay-en-Bray
- Intercommunality: CC Aumale - Blangy-sur-Bresle

Government
  - Mayor (2026–32): Jean-Pierre Courtois
- Area^{1}: 13.71 km^{2} (5.29 sq mi)
- Elevation: 248 m (814 ft)
- Highest elevation: 247 m (810 ft)
- Lowest elevation: 193 m (633 ft)
- Population (2023): 507
  - Density: 37.0/km^{2} (95.8/sq mi)
- Time zone: UTC+01:00 (CET)
  - Summer (DST): UTC+02:00 (CEST)
- INSEE/Postal code: 76186 /76390
- ^{1} French Land Register data, which excludes lakes, ponds, glaciers > 1 km^{2} (0.386 sq mi or 247 acres) and river estuaries.

Conteville (French pronunciation: [kɔ̃tvil]) is a commune in the Seine-Maritime department in the Normandy region in northern France.

== Geography ==
A farming village situated in the Pays de Bray, some 36 miles (58 km) southeast of Dieppe, at the junction of the D9 and the D36 roads.

== Population ==
Historical population
Year	Pop.	±% p.a.
1968	504	—
1975	447	−1.70%
1982	401	−1.54%
1990	460	+1.73%
1999	454	−0.15%
2007	472	+0.49%
2012	544	+2.88%
2017	491	−2.03%
2023	507	+0.54%
Source: INSEE

== Places of interest ==
- The church of St.Nicolas, dating from the eighteenth century.

== See also ==
- Communes of the Seine-Maritime department
