= Vieux-Rouen-sur-Bresle =

- Commune
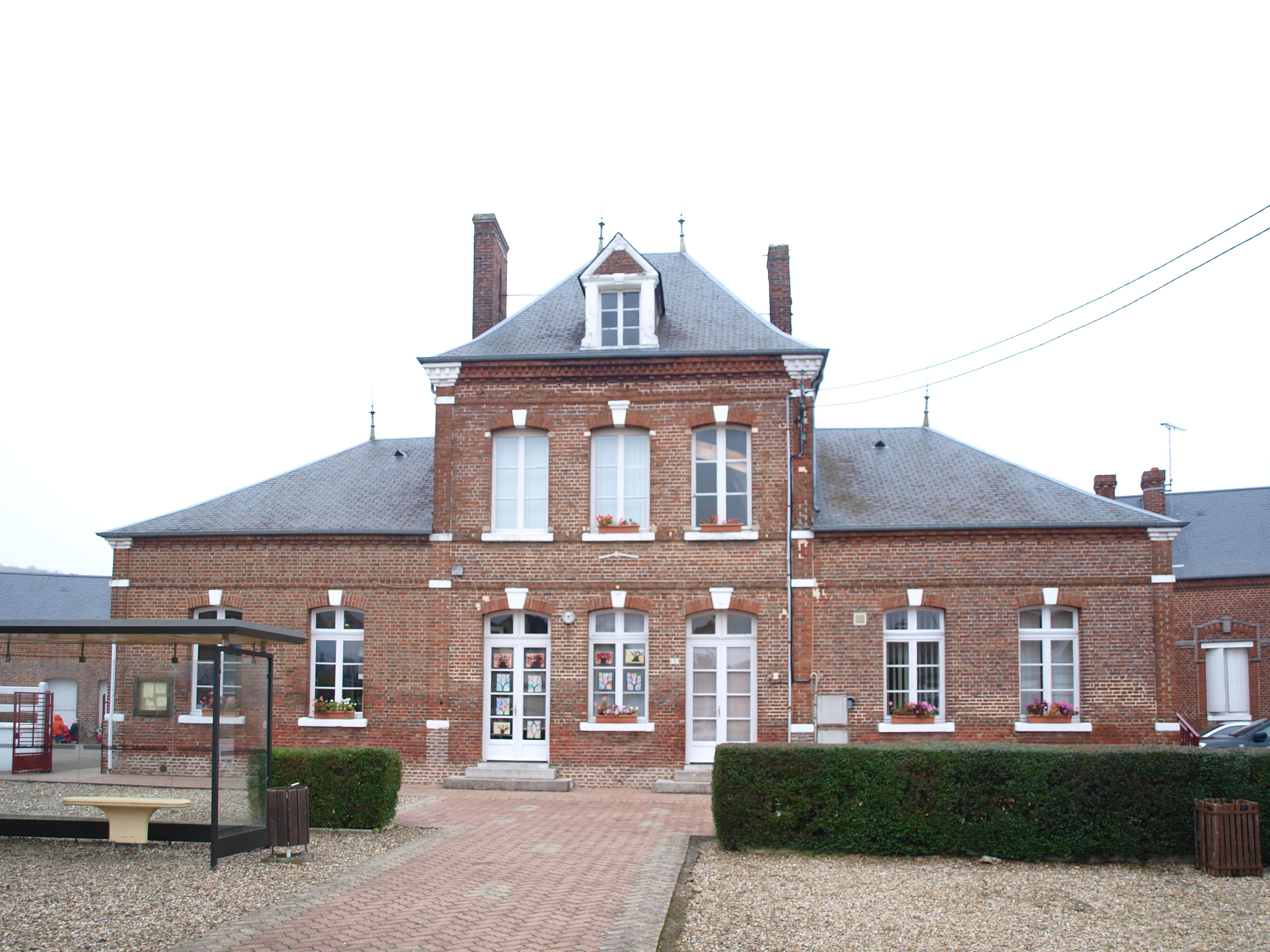
- The town hall and school in Vieux-Rouen-sur-Bresle
- Location of Vieux-Rouen-sur-Bresle
- Location within France Location within Normandy
- Coordinates: 49°50′05″N 1°43′16″E
- Country: France
- Region: Normandy
- Department: Seine-Maritime
- Arrondissement: Dieppe
- Canton: Gournay-en-Bray
- Intercommunality: CC Aumale - Blangy-sur-Bresle

Government
  - Mayor (2026–32): Bruno Borgoo
- Area^{1}: 14.92 km^{2} (5.76 sq mi)
- Elevation: 89 m (292 ft)
- Highest elevation: 210 m (690 ft)
- Lowest elevation: 76 m (249 ft)
- Population (2023): 583
  - Density: 39.1/km^{2} (101/sq mi)
- Time zone: UTC+01:00 (CET)
  - Summer (DST): UTC+02:00 (CEST)
- INSEE/Postal code: 76739 /76390
- ^{1} French Land Register data, which excludes lakes, ponds, glaciers > 1 km^{2} (0.386 sq mi or 247 acres) and river estuaries.

Vieux-Rouen-sur-Bresle (French pronunciation: [vjø ʁwɑ̃ syʁ bʁɛl], literally Old Rouen on Bresle) is a French commune in the Seine-Maritime department in the Normandy region in northern France.

== Geography ==
A village of light industry and farming situated on the banks of the river Bresle in the Pays de Bray, some 27 miles (43 km) southeast of Dieppe at the junction of the D49, D96 and the D60.

=== Description ===
Vieux-Rouen-sur-Bresle is a Norman village in the Bresle valley located in Seine-Maritime and bordering the Somme department, which is part of the old Talou, and is marked by the presence of the glassware created in 1892.

It is crossed by the railway line from Épinay-Villetaneuse to Le Tréport-Mers, but the nearest station is the Aumale station. It is served by the RD 49, which connects Aumale to Tréport by the left bank of the Bresle.

The south and west of the town are wooded.

=== Hydrography ===
The river Bresle and its tributary Méline pass through Vieux-Rouen.

== Population ==
Historical population
Year	Pop.	±% p.a.
1968	750	—
1975	768	+0.34%
1982	676	−1.81%
1990	713	+0.67%
1999	643	−1.14%
2007	673	+0.57%
2012	635	−1.16%
2017	564	−2.34%
2023	583	+0.55%
Source: INSEE

== Places of interest ==
- The church of St. Jean-Baptiste, dating from the twelfth century.
- The church of Notre-Dame, dating from the twelfth century.
- The twelfth-century donjon of the castle of Mateputenam.
- The chateau, dating from the sixteenth century.

== See also ==
- Communes of the Seine-Maritime department
