= Morienne =

- Commune
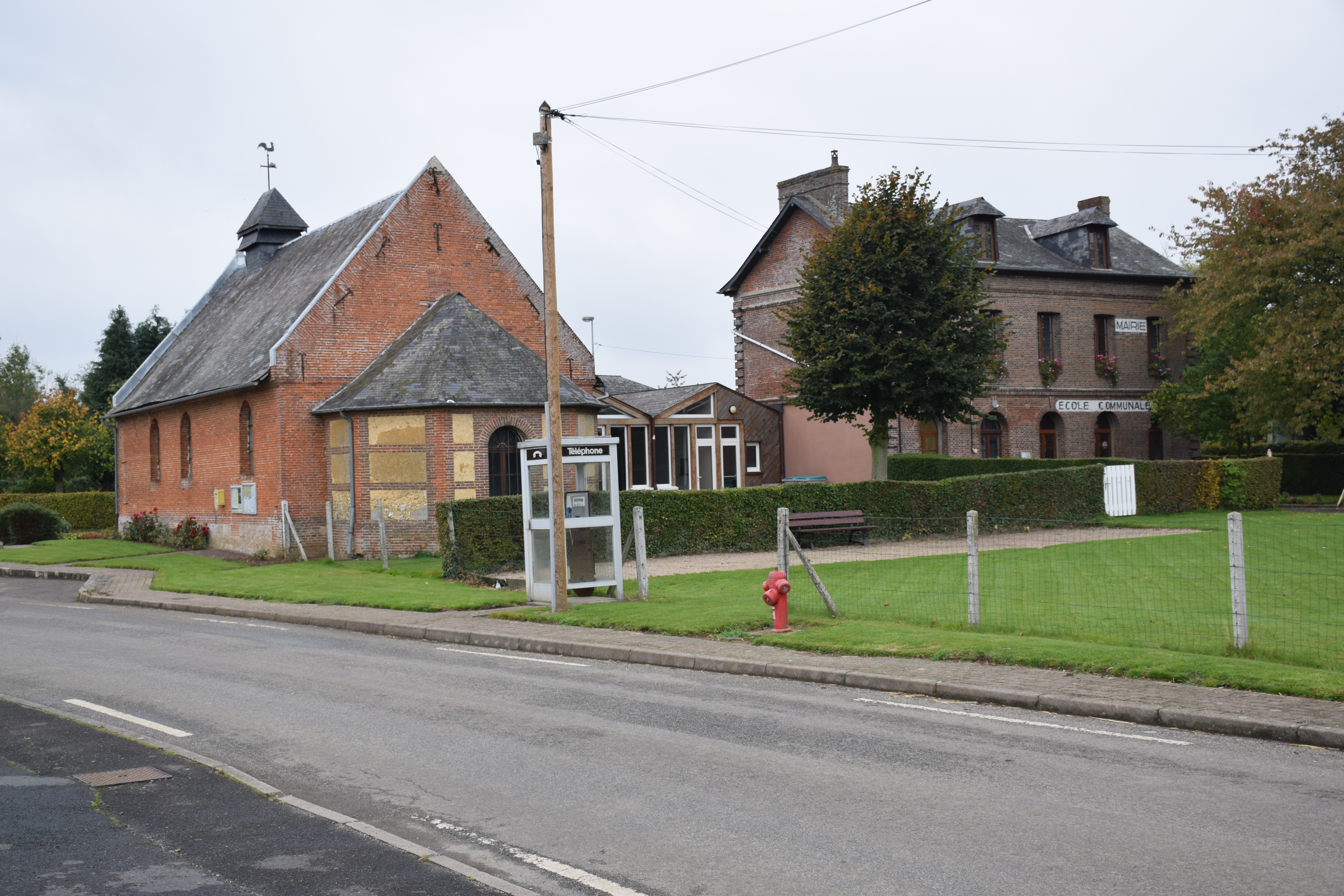
- The church and town hall in Morienne
- Location of Morienne
- Location within France Location within Normandy
- Coordinates: 49°46′58″N 1°42′38″E
- Country: France
- Region: Normandy
- Department: Seine-Maritime
- Arrondissement: Dieppe
- Canton: Gournay-en-Bray
- Intercommunality: CC Aumale - Blangy-sur-Bresle

Government
  - Mayor (2020–2026): Jean-Claude Becquet
- Area^{1}: 8.91 km^{2} (3.44 sq mi)
- Elevation: 200 m (660 ft)
- Highest elevation: 214 m (702 ft)
- Lowest elevation: 105 m (344 ft)
- Population (2023): 187
  - Density: 21.0/km^{2} (54.4/sq mi)
- Time zone: UTC+01:00 (CET)
  - Summer (DST): UTC+02:00 (CEST)
- INSEE/Postal code: 76606 /76390
- ^{1} French Land Register data, which excludes lakes, ponds, glaciers > 1 km^{2} (0.386 sq mi or 247 acres) and river estuaries.

Morienne is a commune in the Seine-Maritime department in the Normandy region in northern France.

== Geography ==
A small farming village situated in the valley of the river Bresle in the Pays de Bray, some 47 kilometres (29 mi) southeast of Dieppe at the junction of the D502 and the D920 roads. The A29 autoroute passes through the territory of the commune.

== Population ==
Historical population
Year	Pop.	±% p.a.
1968	225	—
1975	233	+0.50%
1982	180	−3.62%
1990	190	+0.68%
1999	178	−0.72%
2007	173	−0.36%
2012	173	+0.00%
2017	179	+0.68%
2023	187	+0.73%
Source: INSEE

== Places of interest ==
- The church of St.Clothilde, dating from the eighteenth century.
- Traces of a 12th-century abbey.

== See also ==
- Communes of the Seine-Maritime department
