= Ronchois =

- Commune
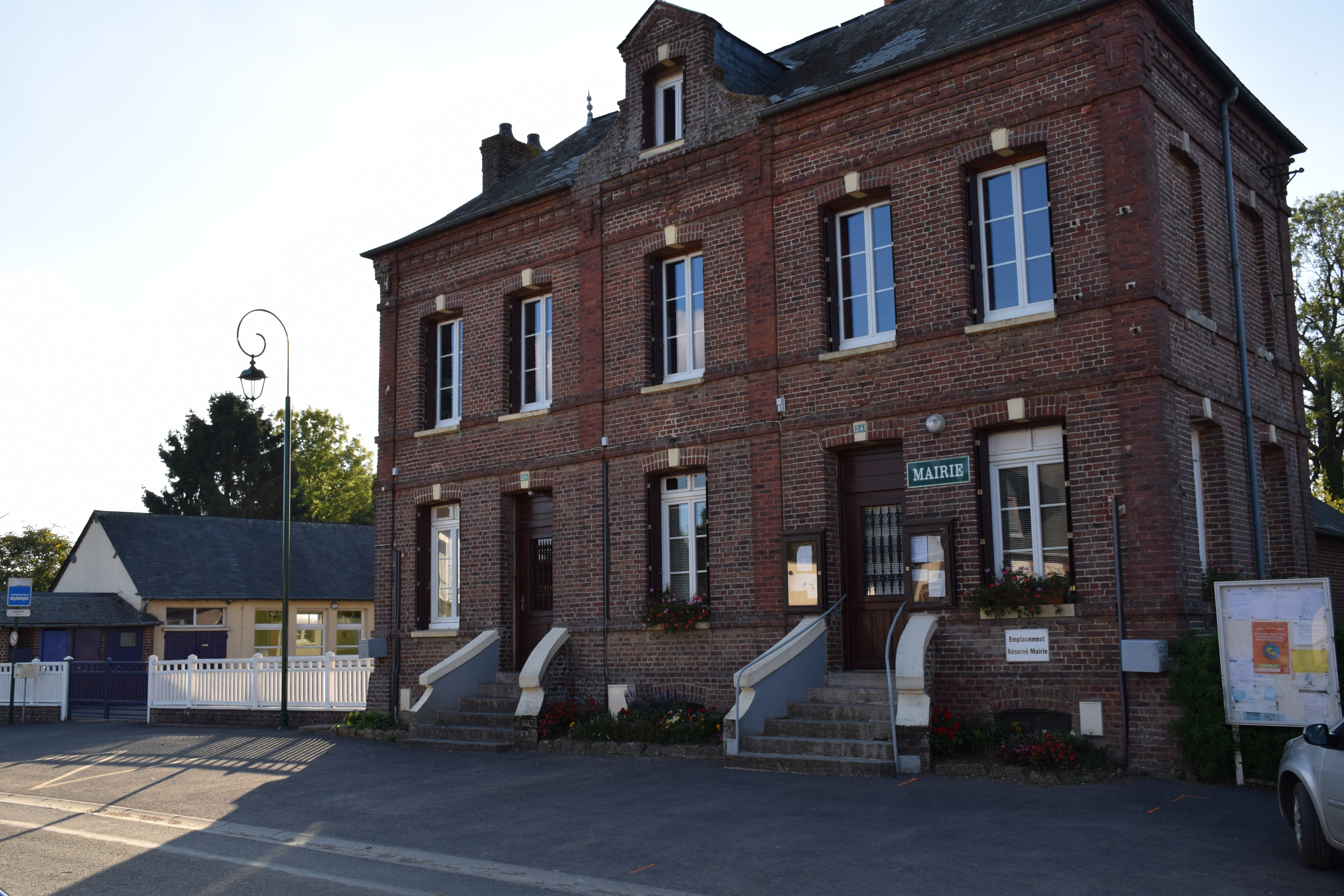
- The town hall in Ronchois
- Location of Ronchois
- Location within France Location within Normandy
- Coordinates: 49°43′25″N 1°37′42″E
- Country: France
- Region: Normandy
- Department: Seine-Maritime
- Arrondissement: Dieppe
- Canton: Gournay-en-Bray
- Intercommunality: CC Aumale - Blangy-sur-Bresle

Government
  - Mayor (2026–32): Jean-François Payen
- Area^{1}: 8.62 km^{2} (3.33 sq mi)
- Elevation: 250 m (820 ft)
- Highest elevation: 245 m (804 ft)
- Lowest elevation: 178 m (584 ft)
- Population (2023): 179
  - Density: 20.8/km^{2} (53.8/sq mi)
- Time zone: UTC+01:00 (CET)
  - Summer (DST): UTC+02:00 (CEST)
- INSEE/Postal code: 76537 /76390
- ^{1} French Land Register data, which excludes lakes, ponds, glaciers > 1 km^{2} (0.386 sq mi or 247 acres) and river estuaries.

Ronchois (French pronunciation: [ʁɔ̃ʃwa]) is a commune in the Seine-Maritime department in the Normandy region in northern France.

== Geography ==
A farming village situated in the Pays de Bray at the junction of the D16 and the D436 roads, some 32 miles (51 km) southwest of Dieppe. The A29 autoroute passes through the northern part of the commune's territory.

== Population ==
Historical population
Year	Pop.	±% p.a.
1968	195	—
1975	177	−1.37%
1982	162	−1.26%
1990	175	+0.97%
1999	169	−0.39%
2007	182	+0.93%
2012	174	−0.89%
2017	175	+0.11%
2023	179	+0.38%
Source: INSEE

== Places of interest ==
- The nineteenth century church of St. Jean.
- Trinity church at Ormesnil, dating from the seventeenth century.

== See also ==
- Communes of the Seine-Maritime department
