= Ellecourt =

- Commune
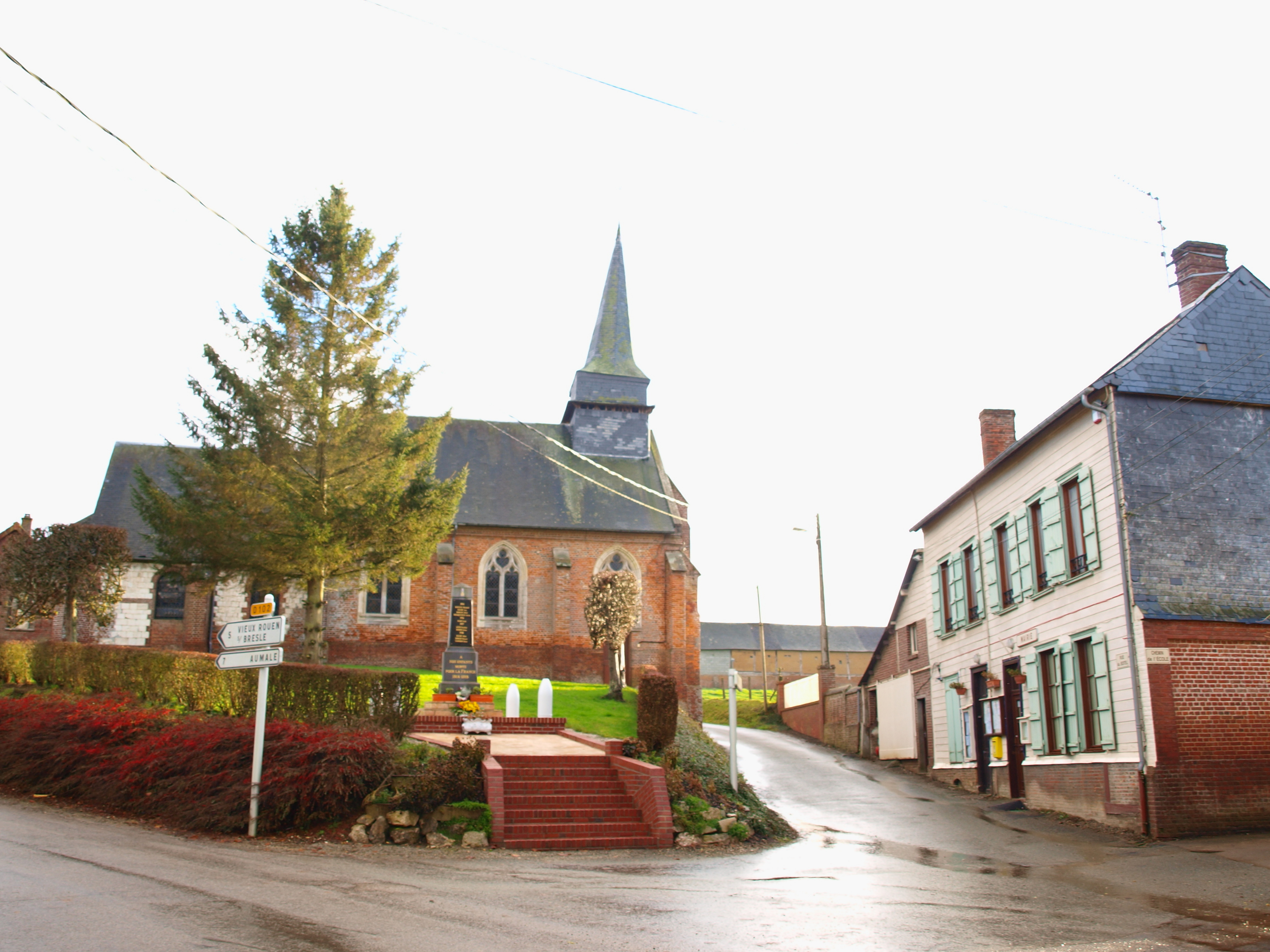
- The centre of Ellecourt
- Location of Ellecourt
- Location within France Location within Normandy
- Coordinates: 49°47′54″N 1°42′57″E
- Country: France
- Region: Normandy
- Department: Seine-Maritime
- Arrondissement: Dieppe
- Canton: Gournay-en-Bray
- Intercommunality: CC Aumale - Blangy-sur-Bresle

Government
  - Mayor (2026–32): Gérard Chaidron
- Area^{1}: 4.45 km^{2} (1.72 sq mi)
- Elevation: 115 m (377 ft)
- Highest elevation: 208 m (682 ft)
- Lowest elevation: 92 m (302 ft)
- Population (2023): 157
  - Density: 35.3/km^{2} (91.4/sq mi)
- Time zone: UTC+01:00 (CET)
  - Summer (DST): UTC+02:00 (CEST)
- INSEE/Postal code: 76233 /76390
- ^{1} French Land Register data, which excludes lakes, ponds, glaciers > 1 km^{2} (0.386 sq mi or 247 acres) and river estuaries.

Ellecourt (French pronunciation: [ɛlkuʁ]) is a commune in the Seine-Maritime department in the Normandy region in northern France.

== Geography ==
A farming village situated at the border with the département of the Somme, in the valley of the river Bresle in the Pays de Bray, some 30 miles (48 km) southeast of Dieppe, at the junction of the D49 and the D102 roads.

== Population ==
Historical population
Year	Pop.	±% p.a.
1968	152	—
1975	138	−1.37%
1982	108	−3.44%
1990	128	+2.15%
1999	150	+1.78%
2007	137	−1.13%
2012	125	−1.82%
2017	147	+3.30%
2023	157	+1.10%
Source: INSEE

== Places of interest ==
- The Renaissance church of St.Mary.

== See also ==
- Communes of the Seine-Maritime department
