= FinanceAsia =

Hong Kong news site

- Categories: Business magazine and daily website
- Frequency: Weekly newsletter, daily online updates, two print issues a year
- Publisher: Haymarket Group
- First issue: 1996
- Country: Hong Kong
- Language: English
- Website: www.financeasia.com

FinanceAsia is a Hong Kong–based publication reporting on Asia Pacific’s financial and capital markets through a daily website and weekly newsletter. At the end of 2005, FinanceAsia was acquired by Haymarket Group, the largest privately owned publishing company in the UK, created in part by Lord Heseltine, the former UK deputy prime minister.

== FinanceAsia ==
FinanceAsia was established in 1996 as a monthly magazine and has since evolved into a more digital format with daily news and a weekly newsletter sent by email. FinanceAsia organises two annual awards for Asia's financial industry, the FinanceAsia Achievement Awards, which each year recognise the region's most significant transactions and the financial institutions that advised on them. In addition, the FinanceAsia Awards recognises the most significant banks, rating agencies and law firms across the region. The trophies are given out at two separate dinners.

== FinanceAsia.com ==
Since 2000, FinanceAsia has had a website that reports daily on capital markets transactions, financial developments and industry hires.

== FinanceAsia Conferences ==
FinanceAsia also organises and hosts conferences throughout the region, focusing on investment, ESG, capital raising and fixed income.
