= Nullemont =

- Commune
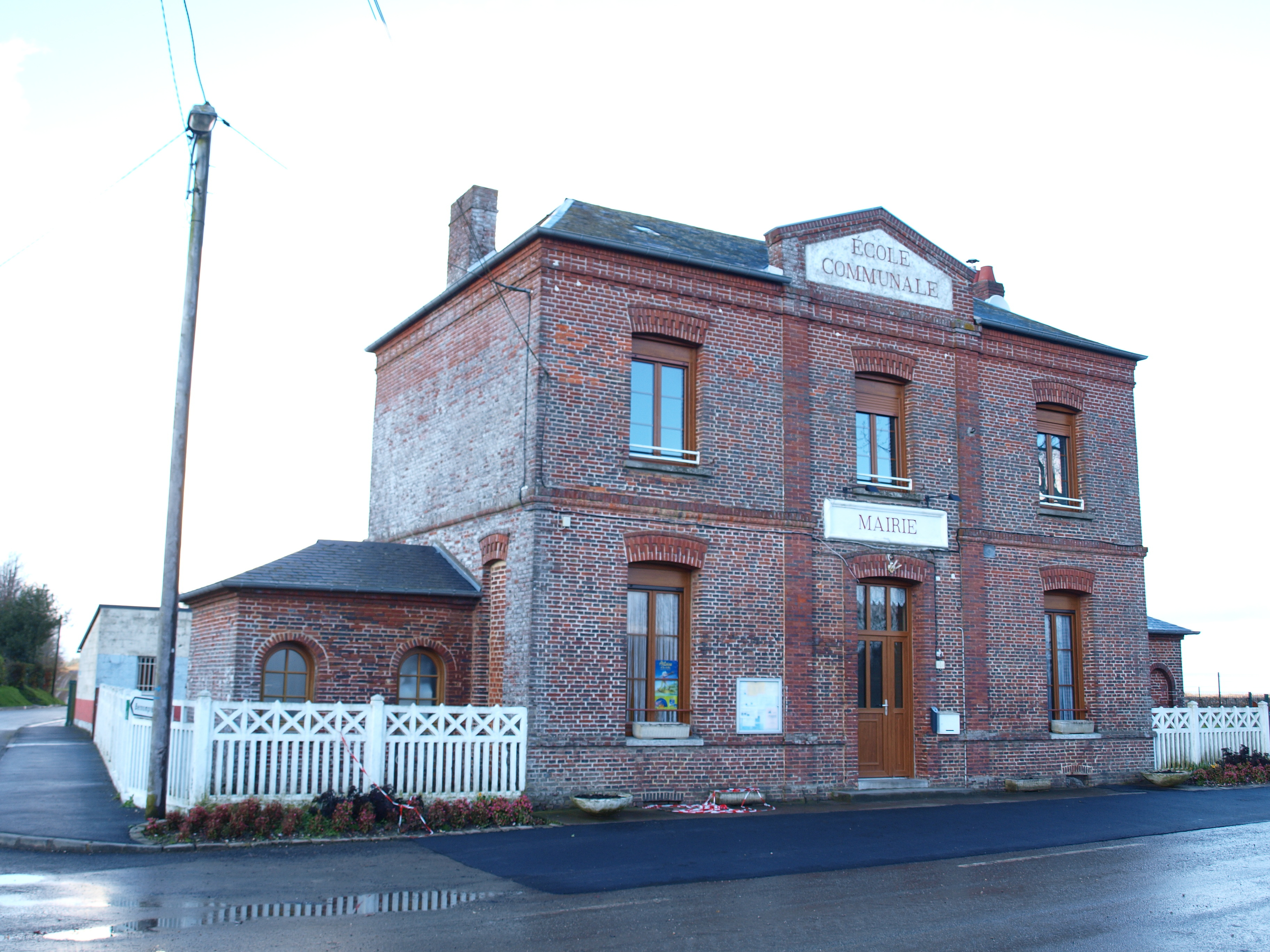
- The town hall in Nullemont

- Coat of arms
- Location of Nullemont
- Location within France Location within Normandy
- Coordinates: 49°46′08″N 1°38′28″E
- Country: France
- Region: Normandy
- Department: Seine-Maritime
- Arrondissement: Dieppe
- Canton: Gournay-en-Bray
- Intercommunality: CC Aumale - Blangy-sur-Bresle

Government
  - Mayor (2026–32): Joël Milon
- Area^{1}: 5.65 km^{2} (2.18 sq mi)
- Elevation: 220 m (720 ft)
- Highest elevation: 227 m (745 ft)
- Lowest elevation: 153 m (502 ft)
- Population (2023): 152
  - Density: 26.9/km^{2} (69.7/sq mi)
- Time zone: UTC+01:00 (CET)
  - Summer (DST): UTC+02:00 (CEST)
- INSEE/Postal code: 76479 /76390
- ^{1} French Land Register data, which excludes lakes, ponds, glaciers > 1 km^{2} (0.386 sq mi or 247 acres) and river estuaries.

Nullemont (French pronunciation: [nylmɔ̃]) is a commune in the Seine-Maritime department in the Normandy region in northern France.

== Geography ==
A small farming village situated in the Pays de Bray at the junction of the D82 and the D102 roads, some 31 miles (50 km) southeast of Dieppe .

== Population ==
Historical population
Year	Pop.	±% p.a.
1968	146	—
1975	146	+0.00%
1982	135	−1.11%
1990	109	−2.64%
1999	102	−0.73%
2007	111	+1.06%
2012	141	+4.90%
2017	135	−0.87%
2023	152	+2.00%
Source: INSEE

== Places of interest ==
- The Church of St. Pierre, dating from the thirteenth century.

== See also ==
- Communes of the Seine-Maritime department
