= Marques, Seine-Maritime =

Marques
- Commune
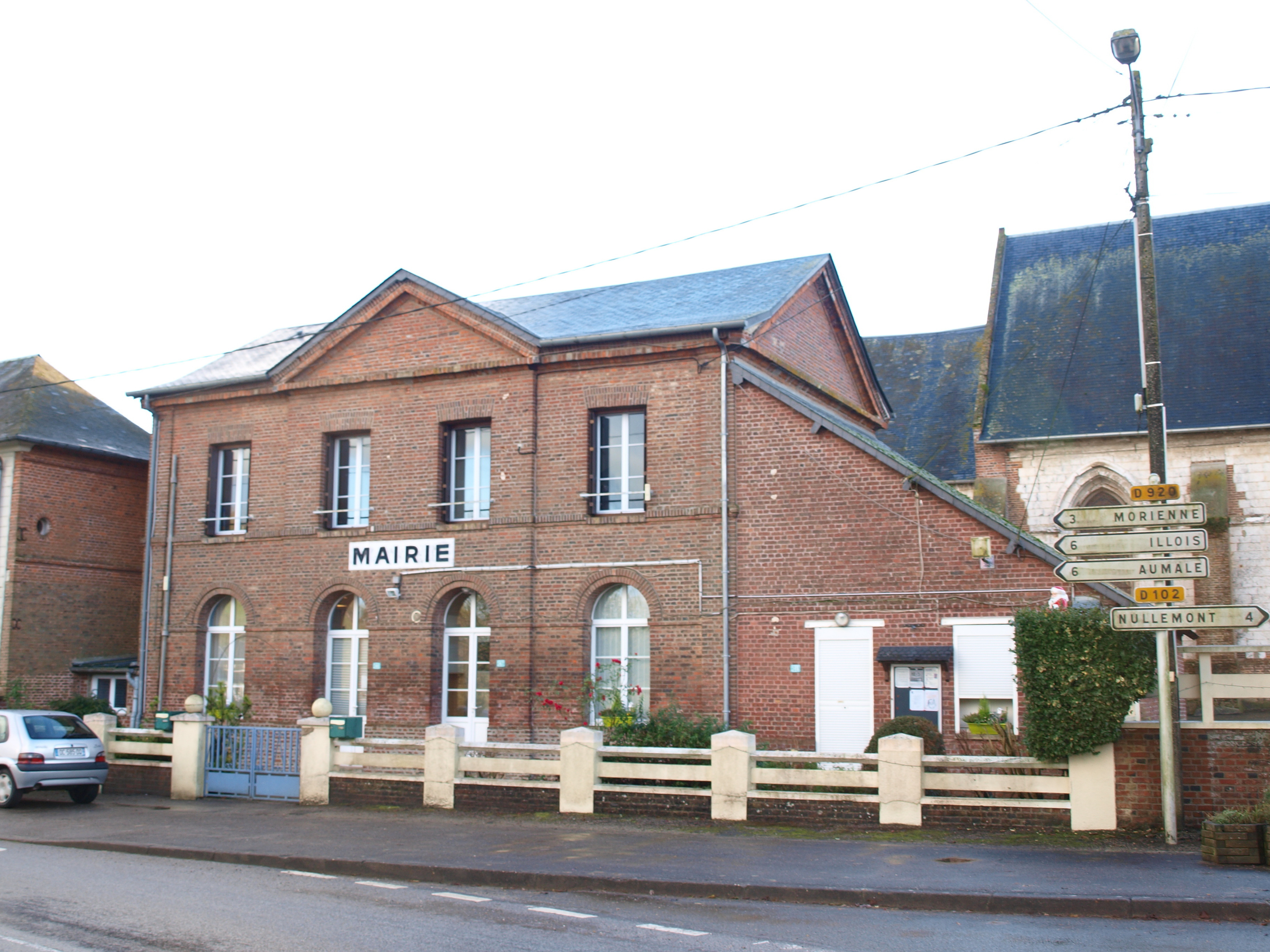
- The town hall and school in Marques

- Coat of arms
- Location of Marques
- Location within France Location within Normandy
- Coordinates: 49°47′05″N 1°41′24″E
- Country: France
- Region: Normandy
- Department: Seine-Maritime
- Arrondissement: Dieppe
- Canton: Gournay-en-Bray
- Intercommunality: CC Aumale - Blangy-sur-Bresle

Government
  - Mayor (2020–2026): Régis Denise
- Area^{1}: 13.05 km^{2} (5.04 sq mi)
- Elevation: 129 m (423 ft)
- Highest elevation: 219 m (719 ft)
- Lowest elevation: 112 m (367 ft)
- Population (2023): 236
  - Density: 18.1/km^{2} (46.8/sq mi)
- Time zone: UTC+01:00 (CET)
  - Summer (DST): UTC+02:00 (CEST)
- INSEE/Postal code: 76411 /76390
- ^{1} French Land Register data, which excludes lakes, ponds, glaciers > 1 km^{2} (0.386 sq mi or 247 acres) and river estuaries.

Marques (French pronunciation: [maʁk]) is a commune in the Seine-Maritime department in the Normandy region in northern France.

== Geography ==
A small farming village situated in the Pays de Bray, some 32 miles (51 km) southeast of Dieppe at the junction of the D920, the D302 and the D102 roads.

== Population ==
Historical population
Year	Pop.	±% p.a.
1968	261	—
1975	258	−0.17%
1982	259	+0.06%
1990	240	−0.95%
1999	238	−0.09%
2007	224	−0.75%
2012	200	−2.24%
2017	232	+3.01%
2023	236	+0.29%
Source: INSEE

== Places of interest ==
- The church of St. Aubin, dating from the sixteenth century.
- The church of St.Lucien at Barques, dating from the eighteenth century.
- The nineteenth century chapel of Saint-Joseph.

== See also ==
- Communes of the Seine-Maritime department
