= Criquiers =

- Commune
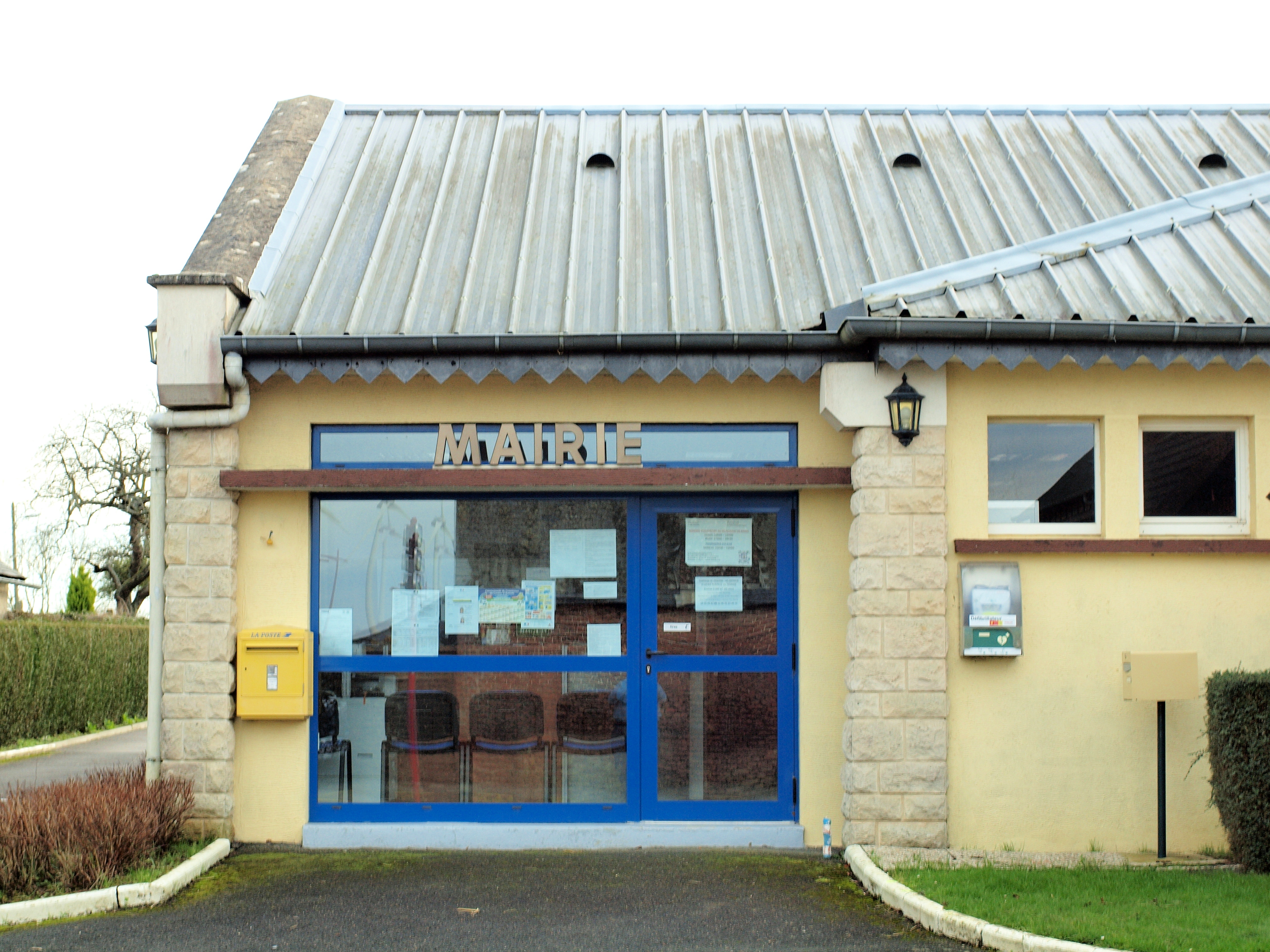
- The town hall in Criquiers

- Coat of arms
- Location of Criquiers
- Location within France Location within Normandy
- Coordinates: 49°40′31″N 1°42′24″E
- Country: France
- Region: Normandy
- Department: Seine-Maritime
- Arrondissement: Dieppe
- Canton: Gournay-en-Bray
- Intercommunality: CC Aumale - Blangy-sur-Bresle

Government
  - Mayor (2026–32): David Michel
- Area^{1}: 23.55 km^{2} (9.09 sq mi)
- Elevation: 230 m (750 ft)
- Highest elevation: 245 m (804 ft)
- Lowest elevation: 164 m (538 ft)
- Population (2023): 716
  - Density: 30.4/km^{2} (78.7/sq mi)
- Time zone: UTC+01:00 (CET)
  - Summer (DST): UTC+02:00 (CEST)
- INSEE/Postal code: 76199 /76390
- ^{1} French Land Register data, which excludes lakes, ponds, glaciers > 1 km^{2} (0.386 sq mi or 247 acres) and river estuaries.

Criquiers (French pronunciation: [kʁikje]) is a commune in the Seine-Maritime department in the Normandy region in northern France.

== Geography ==
A farming village situated in the Pays de Bray, some 30 miles (48 km) southeast of Dieppe, at the junction of the D82, D236 and the D8 roads and on the border with the Oise département.

== Population ==
Historical population
Year	Pop.	±% p.a.
1968	615	—
1975	545	−1.71%
1982	530	−0.40%
1990	581	+1.16%
1999	602	+0.40%
2007	648	+0.92%
2012	669	+0.64%
2017	651	−0.54%
2023	716	+1.60%
Source: INSEE

== Places of interest ==
- The church of Notre-Dame, dating from the seventeenth century.
- A nineteenth century chapel.

== See also ==
- Communes of the Seine-Maritime department
