= Aubéguimont =

- Commune
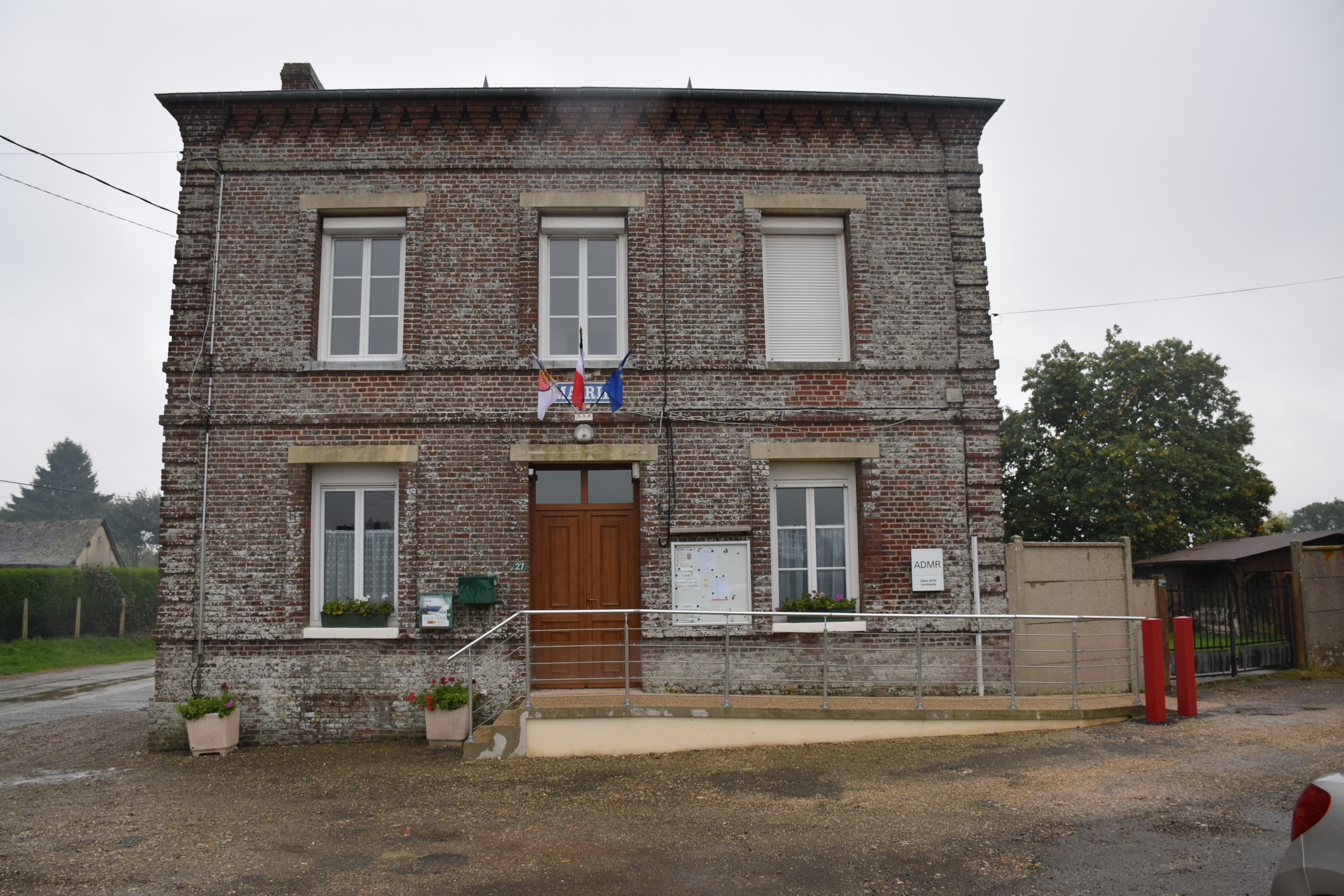
- The town hall in Aubéguimont

- Coat of arms
- Location of Aubéguimont
- Location within France Location within Normandy
- Coordinates: 49°48′30″N 1°40′26″E
- Country: France
- Region: Normandy
- Department: Seine-Maritime
- Arrondissement: Dieppe
- Canton: Gournay-en-Bray
- Intercommunality: CC Aumale - Blangy-sur-Bresle

Government
  - Mayor (2026–32): Jacky Baudon
- Area^{1}: 4.85 km^{2} (1.87 sq mi)
- Elevation: 211 m (692 ft)
- Highest elevation: 211 m (692 ft)
- Lowest elevation: 133 m (436 ft)
- Population (2023): 186
  - Density: 38.4/km^{2} (99.3/sq mi)
- Time zone: UTC+01:00 (CET)
  - Summer (DST): UTC+02:00 (CEST)
- INSEE/Postal code: 76028 /76390
- ^{1} French Land Register data, which excludes lakes, ponds, glaciers > 1 km^{2} (0.386 sq mi or 247 acres) and river estuaries.

Aubéguimont (French pronunciation: [obeɡimɔ̃]) is a commune in the Seine-Maritime department in the Normandy region in northern France.

== Geography ==
A small farming and forestry village in the Pays de Bray, situated some 28 miles (45 km) southeast of Dieppe on the D60 road.

== Population ==
Historical population
Year	Pop.	±% p.a.
1968	208	—
1975	172	−2.68%
1982	160	−1.03%
1990	167	+0.54%
1999	176	+0.58%
2007	180	+0.28%
2012	203	+2.43%
2017	197	−0.60%
2023	186	−0.95%
Source: INSEE

== Places of interest ==
- The church of St.Catherine, dating from the twelfth century.
- The forest of Eu.

== See also ==
- Communes of the Seine-Maritime department
