= Illois, Seine-Maritime =

Illois
- Commune
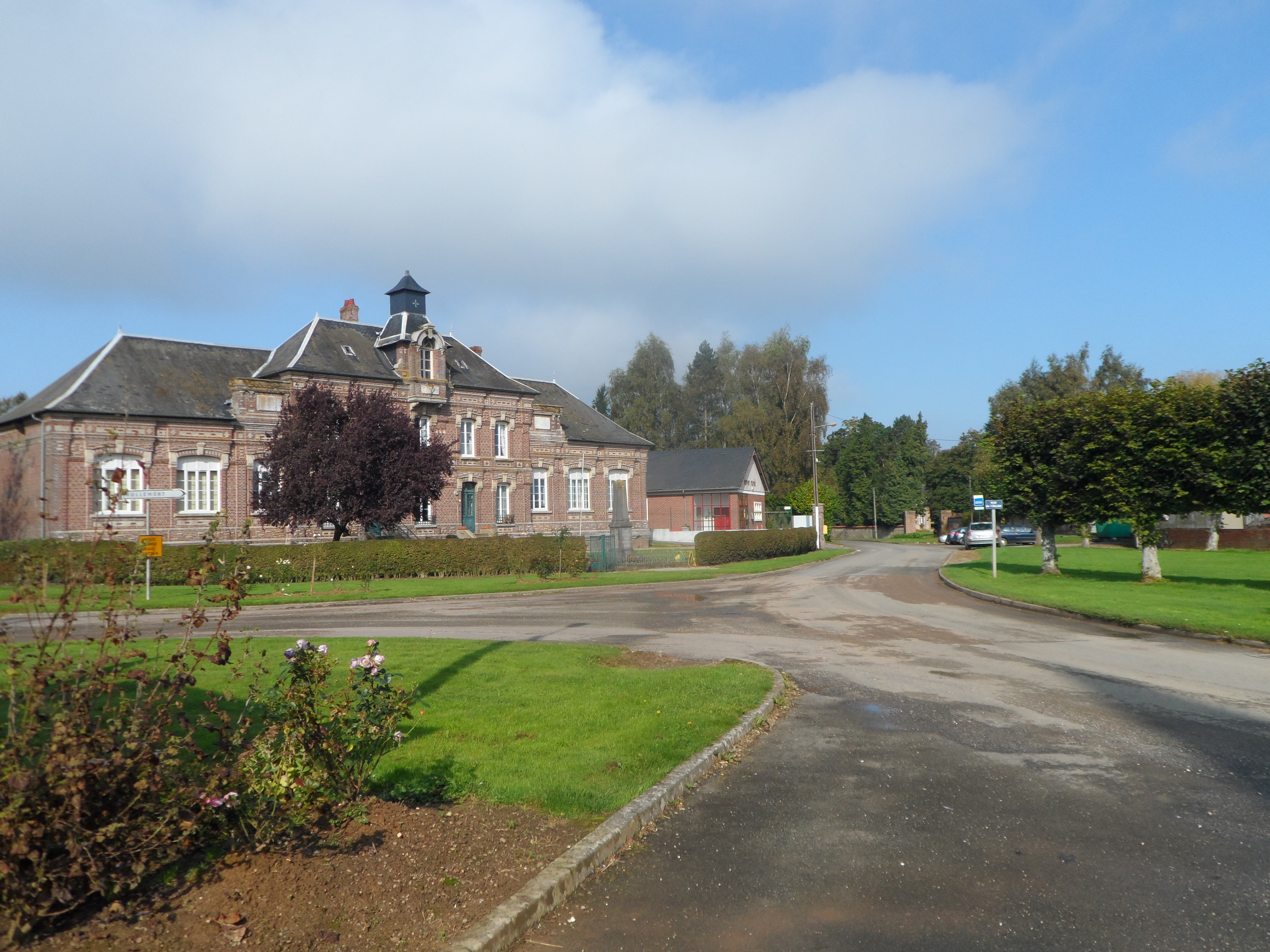
- The town hall in Illois
- Location of Illois
- Location within France Location within Normandy
- Coordinates: 49°45′01″N 1°39′00″E
- Country: France
- Region: Normandy
- Department: Seine-Maritime
- Arrondissement: Dieppe
- Canton: Gournay-en-Bray
- Intercommunality: CC Aumale - Blangy-sur-Bresle

Government
  - Mayor (2026–32): Bernard Haudiquert
- Area^{1}: 14.54 km^{2} (5.61 sq mi)
- Elevation: 226 m (741 ft)
- Highest elevation: 243 m (797 ft)
- Lowest elevation: 175 m (574 ft)
- Population (2023): 381
  - Density: 26.2/km^{2} (67.9/sq mi)
- Time zone: UTC+01:00 (CET)
  - Summer (DST): UTC+02:00 (CEST)
- INSEE/Postal code: 76372 /76390
- ^{1} French Land Register data, which excludes lakes, ponds, glaciers > 1 km^{2} (0.386 sq mi or 247 acres) and river estuaries.

Illois is a commune in the Seine-Maritime department in the Normandy region in northern France.

== Geography ==
A small farming village in the Pays de Bray situated some 35 miles (56 km) southeast of Dieppe at the junction of the D82 with the N29 road. The A29 autoroute also passes through the commune.

== Population ==
Historical population
Year	Pop.	±% p.a.
1968	398	—
1975	363	−1.31%
1982	314	−2.05%
1990	259	−2.38%
1999	266	+0.30%
2007	307	+1.81%
2012	371	+3.86%
2017	407	+1.87%
2023	381	−1.09%
Source: INSEE

== Places of interest ==
- The church of St. Aubin, dating from the nineteenth century.
- The church of St. Denis at Coupigny, dating from the sixteenth century.
- The church of St. Germain at the hamlet of Mesnil-David, dating from the seventeenth century.
- Two seventeenth century chateaux, at Blois and at Coupigny.

== See also ==
- Communes of the Seine-Maritime department
