= Le Caule-Sainte-Beuve =

- Commune
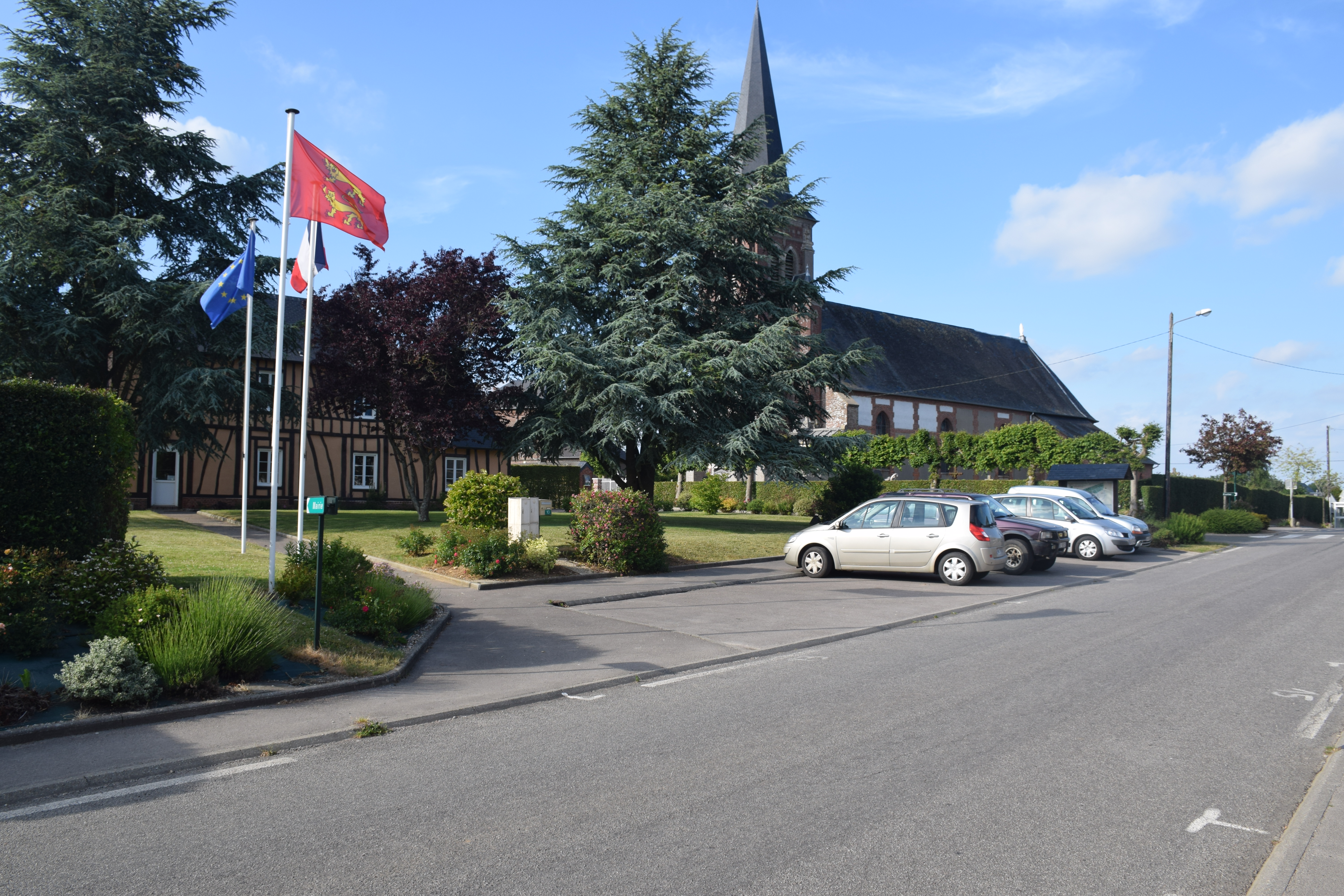
- The town hall and church in Le Caule-Sainte-Beuve
- Location of Le Caule-Sainte-Beuve
- Location within France Location within Normandy
- Coordinates: 49°46′28″N 1°35′23″E
- Country: France
- Region: Normandy
- Department: Seine-Maritime
- Arrondissement: Dieppe
- Canton: Gournay-en-Bray
- Intercommunality: CC Aumale - Blangy-sur-Bresle

Government
  - Mayor (2026–32): Chantal Benoît
- Area^{1}: 16.71 km^{2} (6.45 sq mi)
- Elevation: 228 m (748 ft)
- Highest elevation: 241 m (791 ft)
- Lowest elevation: 161 m (528 ft)
- Population (2023): 473
  - Density: 28.3/km^{2} (73.3/sq mi)
- Time zone: UTC+01:00 (CET)
  - Summer (DST): UTC+02:00 (CEST)
- INSEE/Postal code: 76166 /76390
- ^{1} French Land Register data, which excludes lakes, ponds, glaciers > 1 km^{2} (0.386 sq mi or 247 acres) and river estuaries.

Le Caule-Sainte-Beuve (French pronunciation: [lə kol sɛ̃t bœv]) is a commune in the Seine-Maritime department in the Normandy region in northern France.

== Geography ==
A farming and forestry village, situated in the Pays de Bray, some 33 miles (53 km) southeast of Dieppe at the junction of the D7 and the D16 roads.

== Population ==
Historical population
Year	Pop.	±% p.a.
1968	513	—
1975	472	−1.18%
1982	418	−1.72%
1990	432	+0.41%
1999	402	−0.80%
2007	392	−0.31%
2012	470	+3.70%
2017	487	+0.71%
2023	473	−0.48%
Source: INSEE

== Places of interest ==
- The church of St. Eloi, dating from the seventeenth century.
- St.Jean's church in the hamlet of Ventes, dating from the seventeenth century.
- The church of St. Beuve, dating from the eleventh century.

== See also ==
- Communes of the Seine-Maritime department
