= Charles-Caïus Renoux =

French painter, lithographer, and illustrator

- Renoux's signature: name and year as part of the masonry
- Born: 1795; Paris, France
- Died: 14 March 1846 (aged 50–51); Paris, France
- Known for: Painting, lithography, teaching
- Notable work: Intérieur de l'église Saint-Etienne-du Mont à Paris (c. 1820), Moines dans une Église Gothique en Ruines (1828)
- Movement: Troubadour Style
- Awards: Knight of the Legion of Honor
- Patrons: Alexandre du Sommerard, Louis-Philippe I

Charles-Caius Renoux (born in Paris, 1795; died in Paris, 14 March 1846) was a French painter, lithographer, and illustrator. He first achieved success with paintings of medieval churches, particularly the ruins of cloisters and monasteries destroyed during the French Revolution, works for which he is still best known. Renoux also painted landscapes, large-scale battle scenes, and historical subjects, works which uniquely prepared him for the final phase of his career, the creation of spectacular dioramas, the "moving pictures" of the era. He also taught at the École des Beaux-Arts in Paris; his notable students included Narcisse Berchère and Hector Hanoteau.

== Early success and patronage of du Sommerard ==
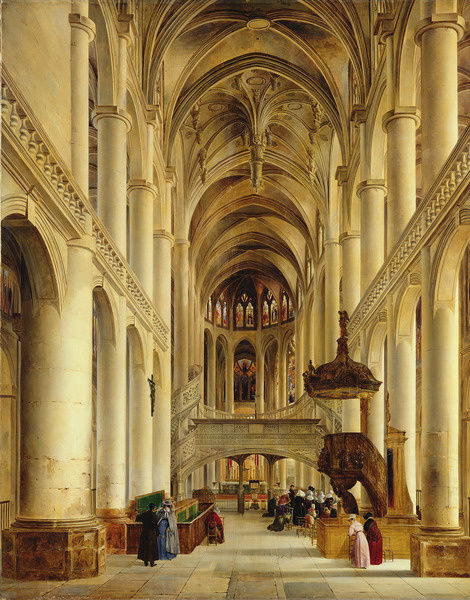
Intérieur de l'église Saint-Etienne-du Mont à Paris (c. 1820, Musée Crozatier)

Contemporary scholar Alfred Maury reaccounts Renoux’s early life and beginnings as an artist:

M. Renoux was barely reaching his fifteenth year when he lost his master [teacher], the only one he had ever had; painting had for this very young man a powerful, indefinable attraction, which the violent opposition of his family could not erase. Desperate to overcome the antipathies of his parents, Renoux leaves the paternal roof; he travels through towns, visits monuments rich in masterpieces; from that moment on, his resolution was unshakable, and the day he took the palette to reproduce the interior of the church of Louviers and the casemates of Château Gaillard, that day, Renoux was able to exclaim with Correggio: "Anch io son pittore! And I too am a painter!"

Maury does not name Renoux’s "only" master (teacher). Catalogues of the Paris Salons typically name a painter’s instructor, but never do so with Renoux. A newspaper of 1825 called him the "student and emulator" of Charles Marie Bouton and Louis Daguerre. Whether or not Renoux took formal instruction from them, these two older artists played an important role in his career.

Whatever his training, by 1822, the year Renoux turned 27, his talents as a painter had attracted the patronage of the antiquarian Alexandre du Sommerard, whose collection of medieval art and artifacts would become the Musée de Cluny. Du Sommerard included lithographs of four works by Renoux in his highly influential Vues de Provins. The book, an illustrated tour of medieval churches and abbeys, many of them reduced to ruins in the violence of the French Revolution, was part of an artistic and literary movement, the troubadour style, that romanticized the Middle Ages in France.

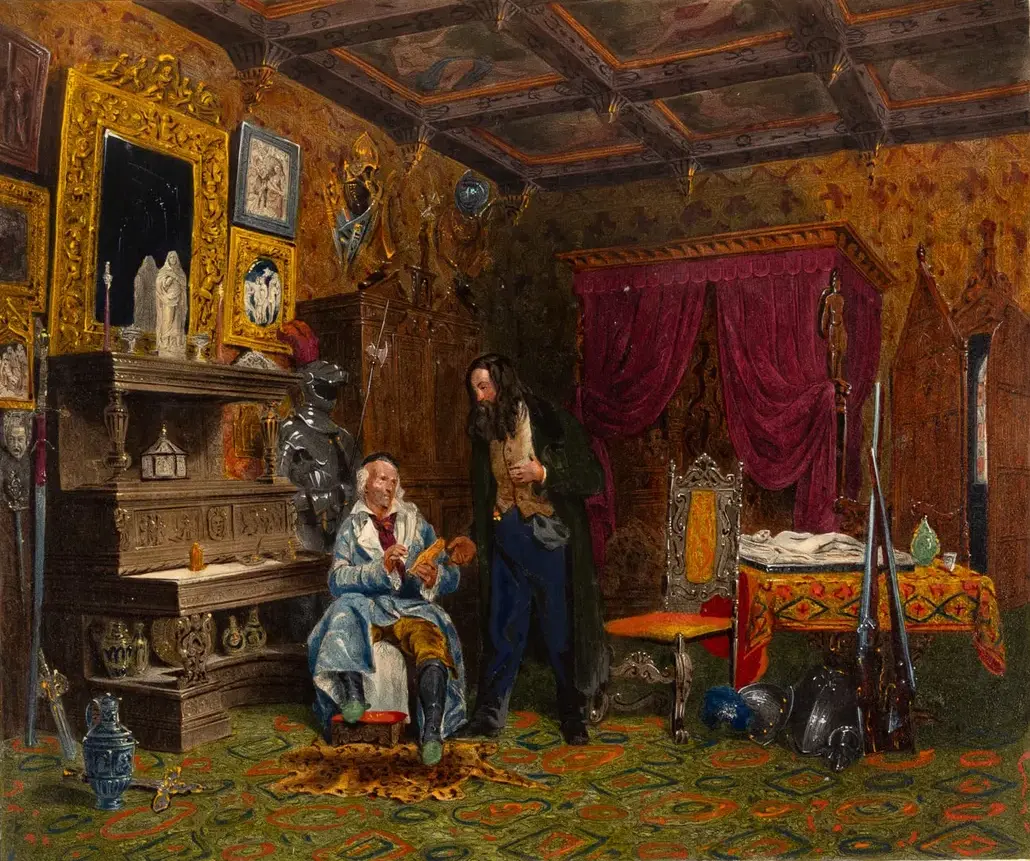
L'Antiquaire, begun by Xavier Leprince, finished by Renoux (1827, whereabouts unknown)

Art historian Pierre Bénard, describing Renoux's Vue du Souterrain de l'Église du Refuge from Vues de Provins, says the image epitomizes the "pleasure of ruins": "Two contemporary figures visit the storied ruin invaded by a great light. And what miracle is it this I see, through the opening from which all these sunbeams fall, the blue sky? In the background, a cheerful half-light swarms behind an archway. Lianas hang gracefully and come together on a blooming scree. This is the…pleasure of ruins where nothing comes to sadden the 'harmony of chaos' praised by Du Sommerard."

That same year, Renoux debuted at the Paris Salon of 1822 with four paintings that garnered him a Medal of the Second Class. These included the two paintings cited by Maury, Vue prise dans l'église de Louviers and Ruines des casemates du château Gaillard, the latter described in the catalogue: "As a result of the persecutions he was experiencing, Nicolas Poussin, forced to leave his country, comes to take a last look at his birthplace."

Two years later, at the Paris Salon of 1824, Renoux exhibited nine paintings, all of which were purchased before the exhibit closed. L'interieur de l’Église Saint-Etienne-du-Mont à Paris was acquired by the state and installed at the Luxembourg Palace. (It is now in the collection of the Musée Crozatier in Le Puy-en-Velay.) Seven paintings were bought by du Sommerard. One of these was La Confession; figures italiennes, depicting one of the seven sacraments of the Catholic Church. By 1827, Renoux had produced paintings depicting each of the seven sacraments; du Sommerard purchased the entire series.

In the Salon of 1827, Renoux displayed L’Antiquaire (The Antiquarian), depicting an elderly collector conferring with a Jewish antiques dealer and surrounded by prized artifacts from his collection. The painting had been begun by another of du Sommerard's protégés, Xavier Leprince, who died before finishing it. To complete the work, du Sommerard commissioned Renoux, who did so "with rare talent." A contemporary reviewer noted that "at the time of Xavier Leprince's death, the two figures alone were made, and the rest was hardly sketched out. It is M. Renoux who was commissioned to complete this interior," consisting of furniture, armor, and numerous objets d'art from the Middle Ages; "finally everything comes together to make this painting a precious piece." The contemporary critic Auguste Jal declared the painting "a perfect work." L’Antiquaire has been cited by modern scholars researching the history of antiquarianism and the invention of the modern museum.

== Signature works ==
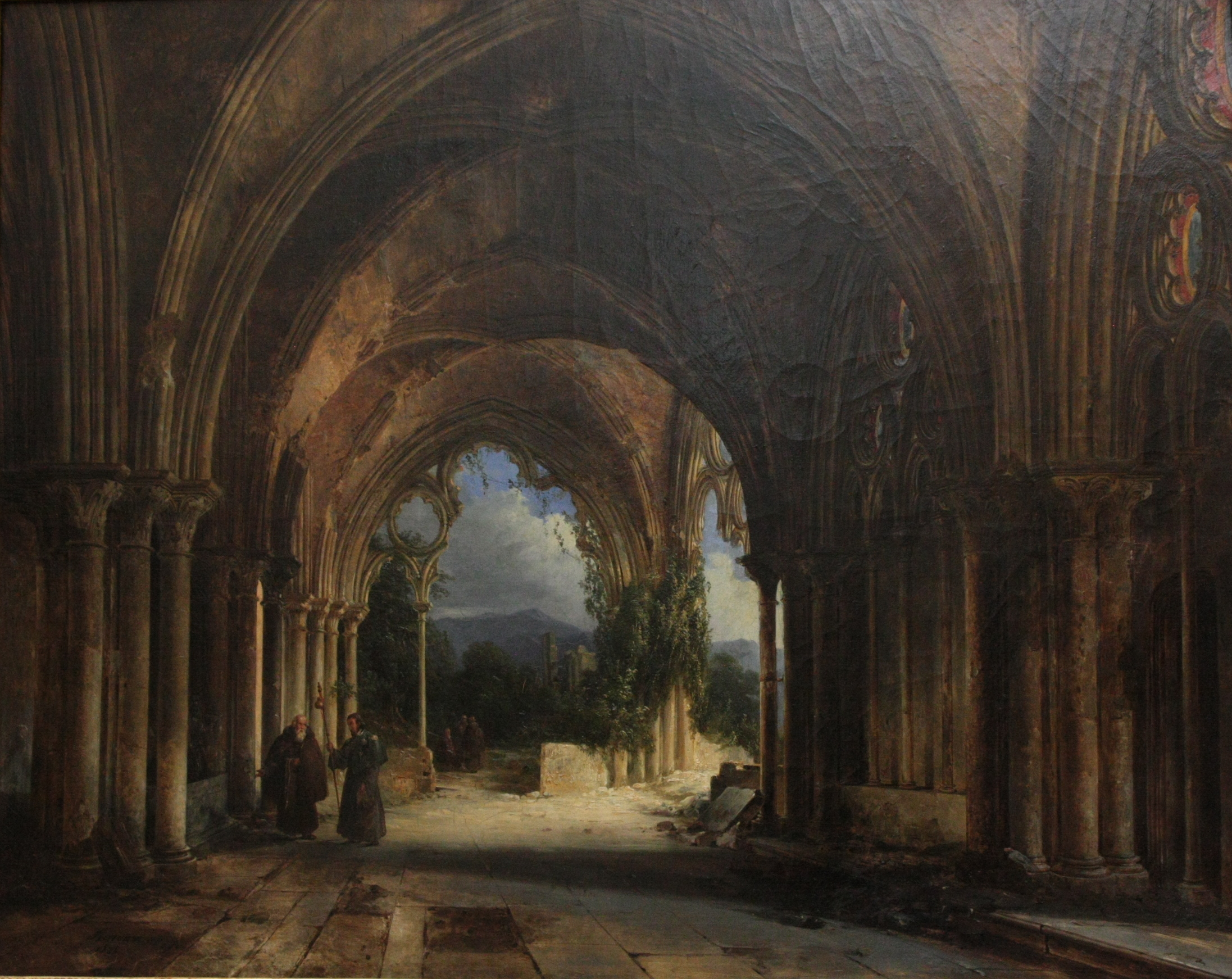
Moines dans une Église Gothique en Ruines (1828, Musée de Grenoble)

In this initial period of his career, Renoux established a signature style with his depictions of Gothic interiors and ruins. The architecture itself serves as a frame, like a proscenium arch in a theater, for an image of repeating columns and arches that recede into the distance, which my terminate in an opening onto blue sky; greater attention is devoted to architectural features, especially the play of light and shadow on weathered stone, than to the human figures, who are dwarfed by their surroundings; and the artist signs his last name and the year at an angle, as if the letters and numbers were painted upon a stone surface within the picture.

A French scholar notes that Renoux "uses the effects of light contrasts and shaded lines of architecture to create games of abstract construction and repetition, in the manner of Nordic painters (one thinks of Hendryck van Steenwick the Younger in particular)."

The Romanesque and Gothic ruins, underground passages, chapels, convents, vaulted cellars, crypts and galleries depicted by Renoux were inspired by his travels through France, Switzerland, Germany, and Italy. Some paintings are minutely detailed, scrupulously accurate depictions of actual places, but others appear to be fancifully embellished or largely imaginary. The mood evoked is both nostalgic and timeless. "The picturesque and the fabulous encroach on objective representation, and substitute myth…This is how Hugo saw heritage. Mature, vertiginous, dramatic, mysterious, disputed by time and by the great outdoors, haunted by the combat of light and shadows."

== Landscapes, battles scenes, and history paintings ==
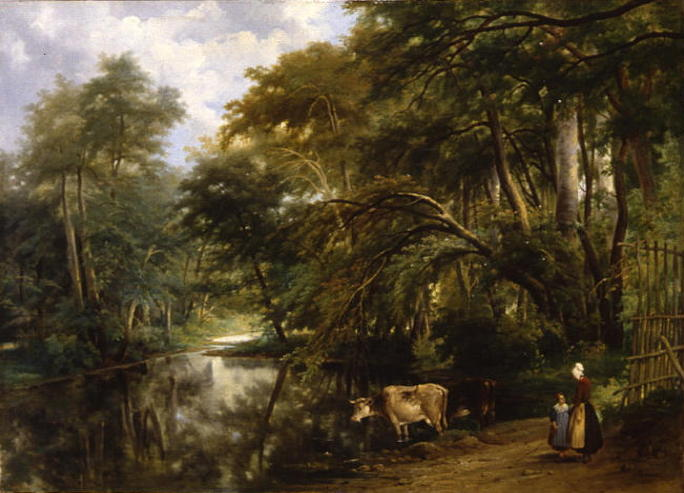
Vue de la Cavée Saint-Martin, près de la Forêt de Compiègne (1833, Musée de Soissons)

Renoux also found early success as a painter of interiors (such as Intérieur d'une chambre au XVIe siècle of 1831) and landscapes. The Annuaire Statistique des artistes français of 1836 called him "one of our best landscape artists."

Renoux made lithographs of his own works and the works of other artists for various books and folios, including du Sommerard’s multi-volume Les Arts au Moyen âge (1838-1846) and the comte de Trobriand’s Voyage pittoresque en Bretagne (1845-1846, part of the series Voyages pittoresques et romantiques dans l'ancienne France).

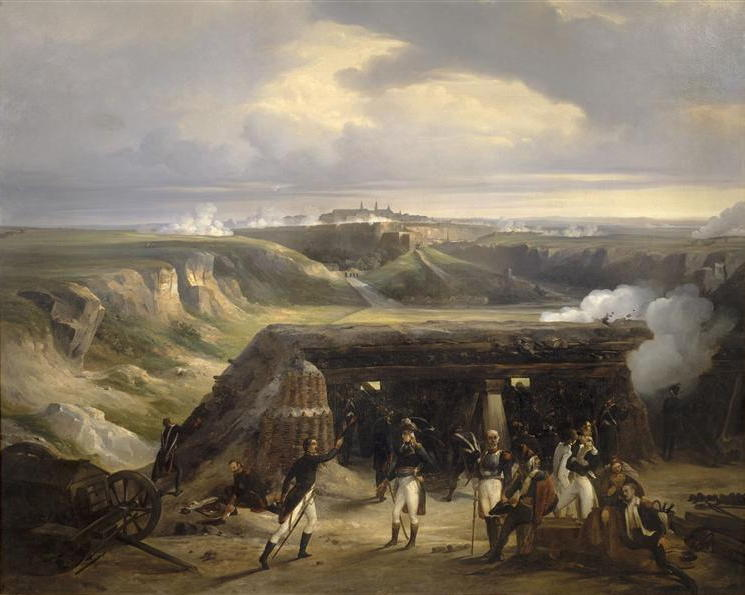
Siège de Luxembourg, 12 Juin 1795 (1837, Musée National des Châteaux de Versailles et de Trianon)

In 1836, Renoux received a monumental commission by Louis-Philippe I to paint a series of fifteen historical and battle paintings for the Palace of Versailles, most of which are now in the Musée de l'Histoire de France at Versailles. Maury was effusive in his praise of these works, citing Siège de Luxembourg, 12 juin 1795 as "above all worthy of the highest praise; we cannot approve enough the decision to place this brilliant work in the Louvre exhibition; the public, as we have witnessed several times, never tire of admiring the surrender of Luxembourg, and this is the most solemn success an artist can claim."

Another critic said the same painting offered "new proof of the disastrous result of the transformation of artists accustomed to genre, landscape or interior subjects into painters of battles. M. Renoux, whose talent for interiors is known, has failed in this representation of a siege; his figures are badly posed and badly drawn…the tone of its landscape is harsh and raw; finally, one senses everywhere the confused man, outside his sphere."

== Dioramas ==
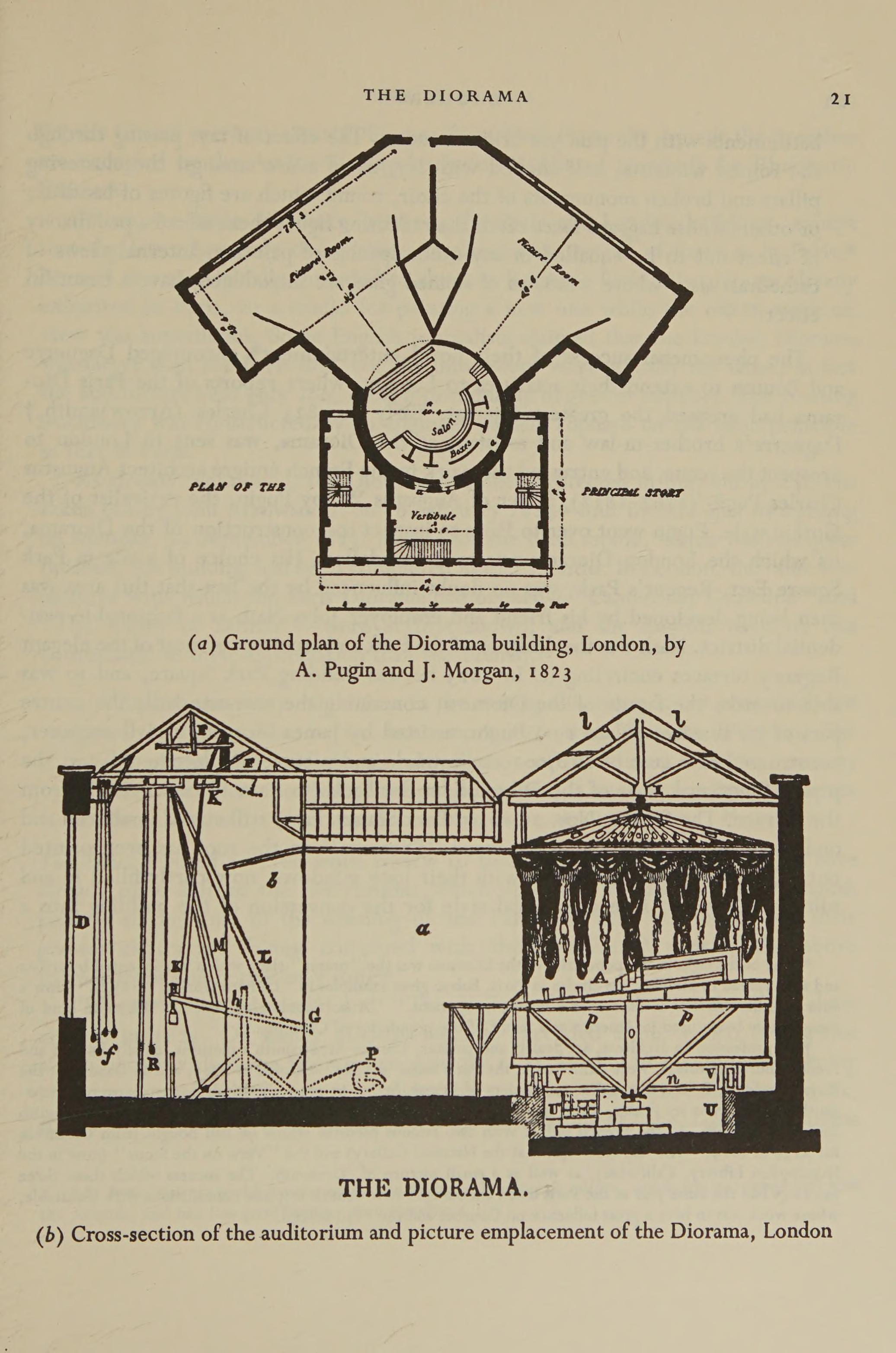
Ground-plan of the Diorama Building, London 1823, by A. Pugin and J. Morgan.

Renoux was an artist for the diorama theaters created in the 1820s by Daguerre and Bouton. These featured enormous images (the first were over 71 by 45 feet) were viewed by an audience in a revolving theater.

They were lit both from above and from behind, and the remarkable diverse effects were produced by combinations of transparent and opaque painting and by light transmitted through ground glass and coloured translucent screens on to the front of the picture, and through it from the back by means of long, vertical ground-glass windows, which could be shuttered when necessary or covered partially or entirely with pieces of coloured glass worked by pulleys and counterweights.

Renoux created "several double-effect diorama pieces, among them The Cathedral of Notre Dame, Paris, The Interior of the Abbey Church of St. Owen, Rouen, and View of Heidelberg." From 1840 until his death in 1846 he ran The Diorama, Regent's Park in London. Advertisements and notices that year invited customers "to see the new and splendid view, The Shrine of the Nativity at Bethlehem, painted by M. Renoux...and the view of The Coronation of Queen Victoria in Westminster Abbey, by M. Bouton."

== Legacy ==
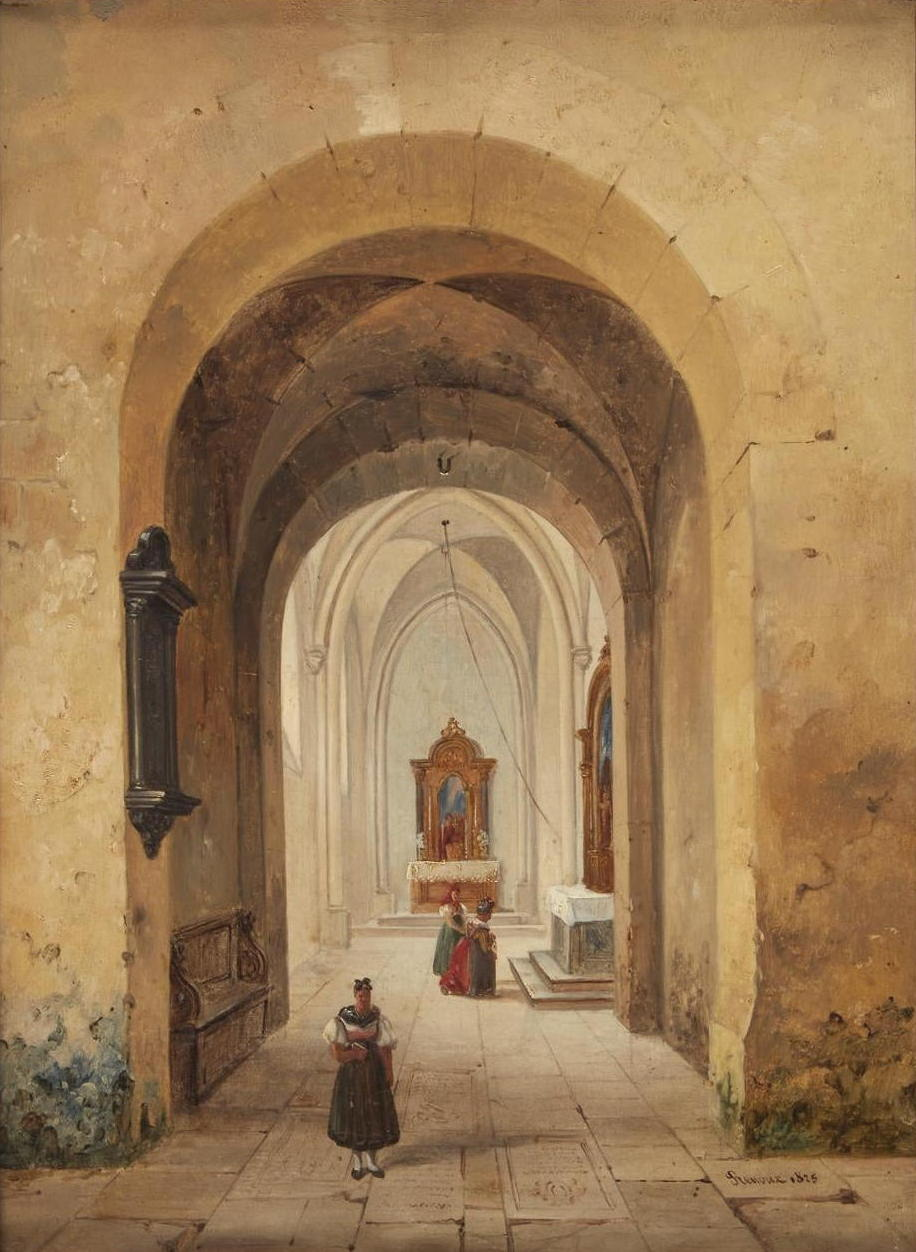
Italian Cloister (1825, private collection), possibly one of the seven paintings depicting each of the seven sacraments which were purchased from Renoux by his patron Alexandre du Sommerard.

In 1838 Renoux was named a Knight of the Legion of Honor.

His signature was among the 213 on a petition of 1840 demanding reform of the juried selection process for the annual Paris Salon, which many artists felt had become corrupted by favoritism and factional rivalries.

Renoux died in Paris on 14 March 1846.

Among his students at the Ecole des Beaux Arts were Augustin Bader, Narcisse Berchère, Antoine Drulin, Hector Hanoteau, Auguste-Leon Mellé, Jean-Gaspar Myeire, Philippe Rondé, and Henri-Gustave Saltzmann. He also taught Pierre-François Beauvallet, who became famous not as a painter but as an actor at the Comédie-Française.

Renoux's continuing appeal to connoisseurs and collectors is explained by the art historian Jacques Thuillier:

The romanticism of this painter does not turn to gloomy subjects or to the very intellectual pessimism then cultivated by so many poets. He keeps the alert frankness of an artist who finds in the spectacle of architecture and nature a sincere pleasure.…Few paintings combine so delicately the majesty of Gothic art, the melancholy of ruins and the serenity of a retreat preserved in the heart of nature.

== Renoux at auction ==
A record for a Renoux painting was set by Interior of a Salon (1826), auctioned for $33,000 at Sotheby's in New York in 2006. Les trois glorieuses: Le peuple franchit le Pont des Arts (c. 1830) was auctioned for €20,000 at Osenet, Fontainbleu, in 2021. Other results include $8125 for Conversation in a Medieval Cloister (1825) in 2019, €6829 for Departing Hunt Party (1832) in 2016, €5460 for Ruines Animées de Personnages (1827[?]) in 2015, and €5000 for Prière dans l'Église (1826) in 2015.

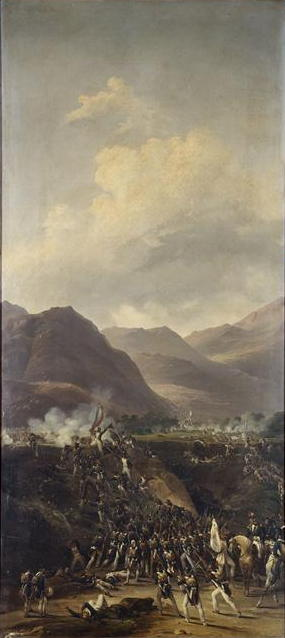
Prise du Camp de Boulou, 1er Mai 1794 (1836, Musée National des Châteaux de Versailles et de Trianon)

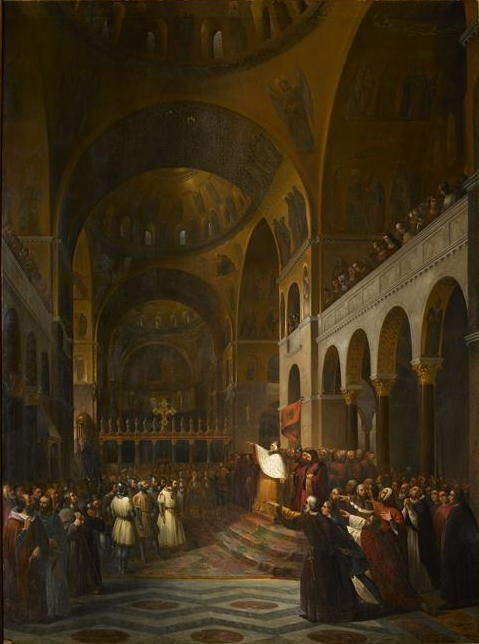
Traité Conclu entre les Croisés et les Vénitiens dans l'Église Saint-Marc en 1201 (1839, Musée National des Châteaux de Versailles et de Trianon)

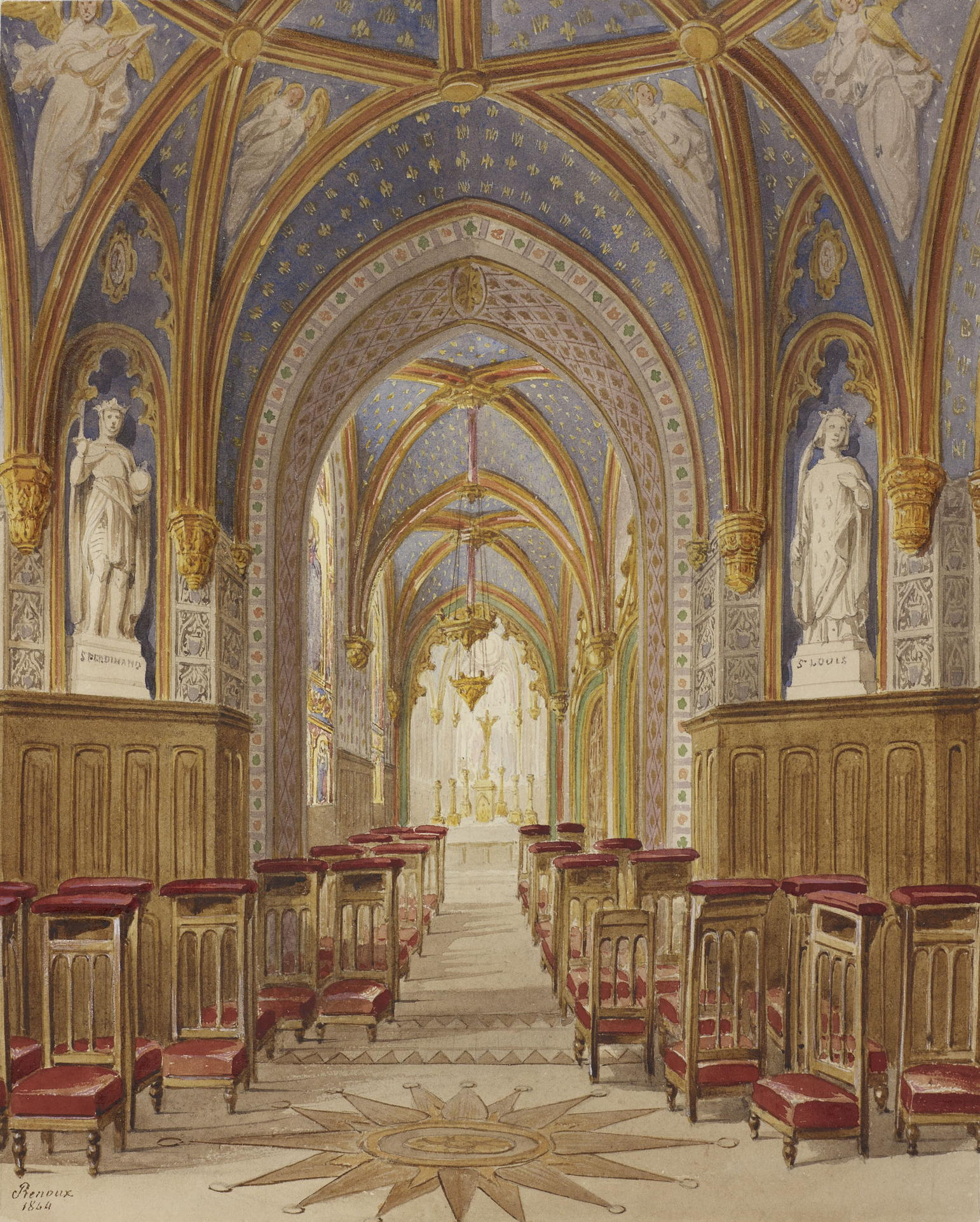
Royal visit to Louis-Philippe: Interior of the Chapel at the Château d'Eu (1844, Royal Collection Trust)

== In museums ==
=== France ===
- Compiègne, Musée National du Château de Compiègne: Intérieur d'une chambre au XVIe siècle (1831)
- Grenoble, Musée de Grenoble: Moines dans une église gothique en ruines (1828)
- Le Puy-en-Velay:
  - Hôtel de préfecture de la Haute-Loire: Paysage, lever de soleil
  - Musée Crozatier: Intérieur de l'église Saint-Étienne-du-Mont à Paris (c. 1820)
- Lisieux, Musée d'Art et d'Histoire de Lisieux: Galerie d'un cloître
- Nantes, Musée des Beaux-Arts: Étude de rochers
- Paris, Musée du Louvre:
  - Séance royale pour l'ouverture de la session des chambres au Louvre
  - Épisode des croisades dans l'église Saint-Marc à Venise (drawing)
- Paris Musée Carnavalet:
  - La maison dite de François Ier, à Moret, avant son transfert à Paris, en 1824, au Cours-la-Reine (1822)
- Sainte-Menehould, Musée d'Art et d'Histoire, Galerie Historique de Versailles: La Prise de Philipsbourg, 29 octobre 1688 (1836)
- Saint-Cyr-l'École, Lycée militaire: Reddition de Dinkelsbuhl août 1645, d'après Sauveur Le Conte
- Soissons, Musée de Soissons: Vue de la Cavée Saint-Marin, près de la Forêt de Compiègne (1833)
- Versailles:
  - Hôtel de ville de Versailles:
    - Plan de la bataille de Nordlingen, 3 août 1645 (1836)
    - Siège et prise de Rothenbourg en 1645, after Sauveur Le Conte
  - Musée de l'Histoire de France:
    - Bataille de la Croix des Bouquets, 23 juin 1794 (1836)
    - Prise de Gand, 12 mars 1678 (1836)
    - Prise de Palamos, juin 1694 (1836)
    - Prise de Roses,9 juin 1693 (1836)
    - Prise du château de L'Escalcette, 8 novembre 1676 (1836)
    - Prise du camp de Boulou, 1 mai 1794 (1836)
    - Reprise du camp de Peyrestortes le 18 août 1793
    - Siège de Luxembourg, 12 juin 1795 (1837), aile sud des ministres
    - Mariage du duc de Berry et de Caroline, princesse des Deux-Siciles, le 17 juin 1816 (1843)
    - Traité conclu entre les croisés et les Vénitiens dans l'église Saint-Marc en 1201 (1839)
    - Combat de Monteilla, 10 avril 1794 (1837; missing)
    - Reprise de Bellegarde, 17 septembre 1794 (1837; missing)
    - Combat du mas de Roz, 17 juillet 1793, after Jacques Gamelin (1837; destroyed)
  - Musée Lambinet:
    - Intérieur de cloître (1830)
    - Chapelle du château de Saint-Germain
    - Bords du Rhin, la dévotion à la chapelle
    - Heidelberg
    - Homme couché près de la chapelle de Bellème
    - Intérieur de ferme
    - La Prédication
    - Le Château de Lavardire, la tour d'Andenach
    - Manoir au bord d'un étang
    - Paysage avec maison en ruines
    - Le Cloître de Saint-Sever près Rouen
- Vire, Musée de Vire:
  - Couple lisant dans les ruines
  - Personnages dans les ruines

=== England ===
- Royal Collection Trust:
  - Royal Visit to Louis-Philippe: Bedroom of Madame Adélaide at the Château d'Eu (1844)
  - Royal visit to Louis-Philippe: Interior of the Chapel at the Château d'Eu (1844)

== Gallery (chronological) ==
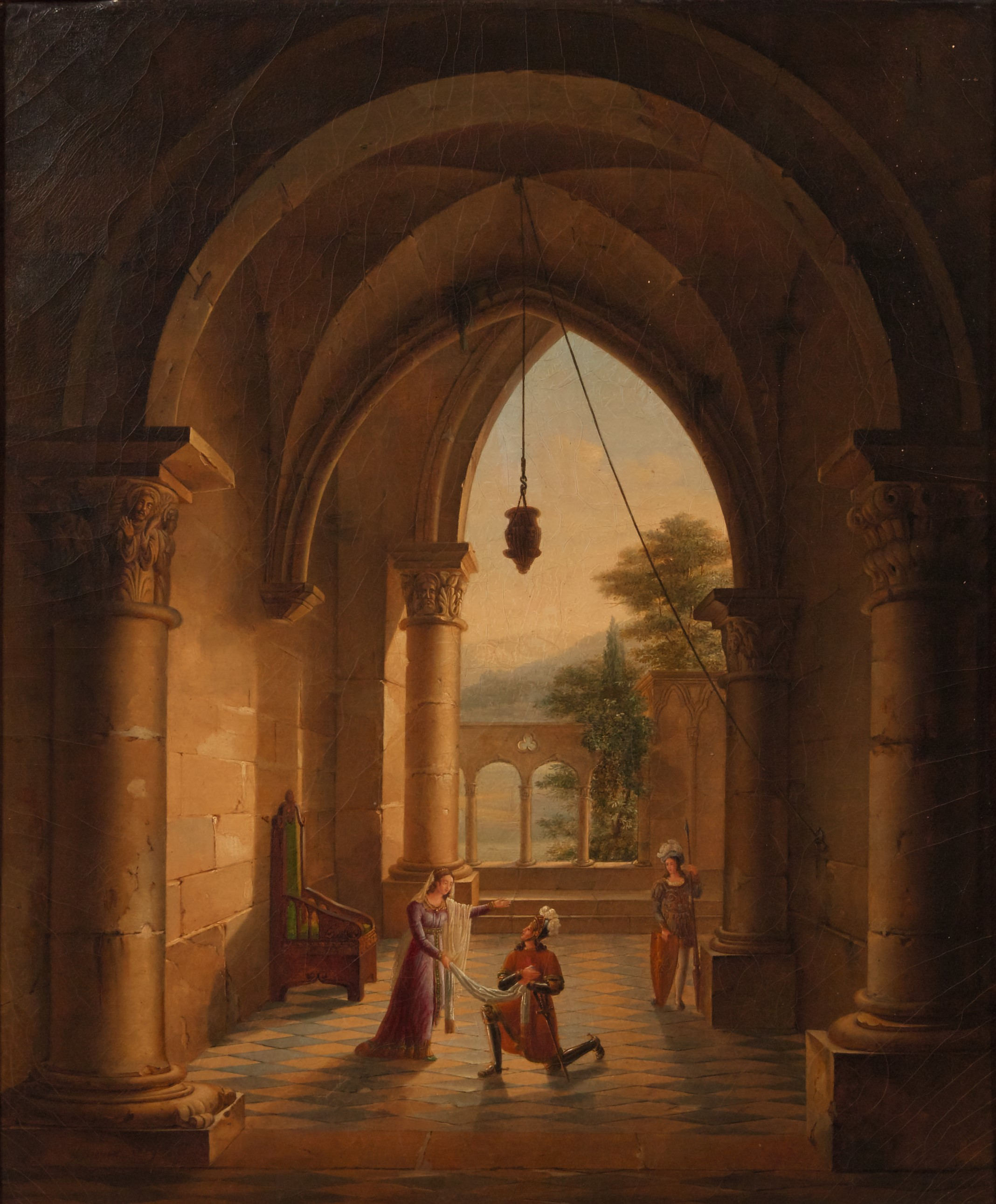
Scene from Gabriella di Vergy (1819)

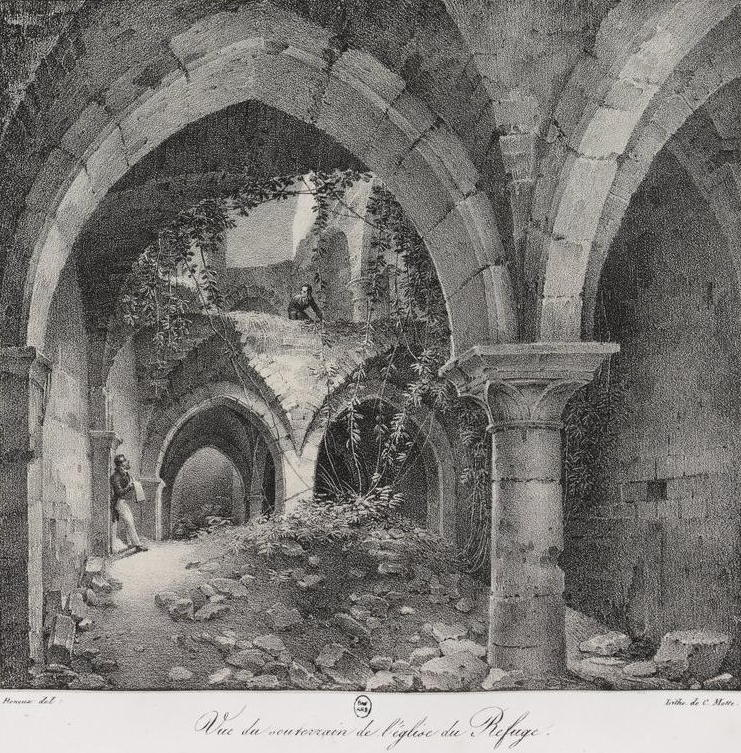
Vue du Souterrain de l'Église du Refuge from the book Vues des Provins (1822)

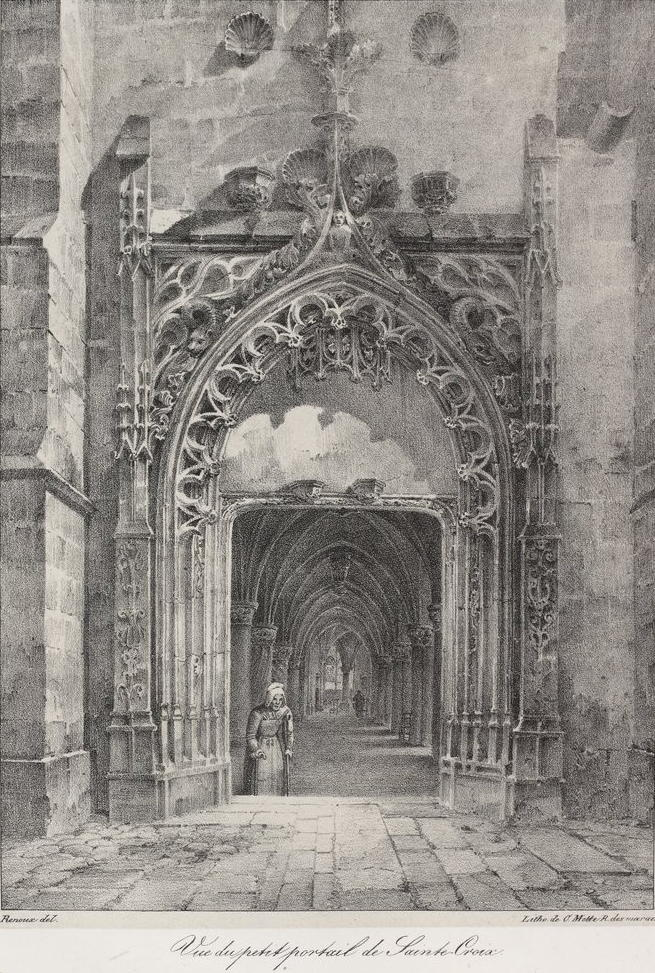
Vue du Petit Portail de Sainte-Croix from the book Vues des Provins (1822)

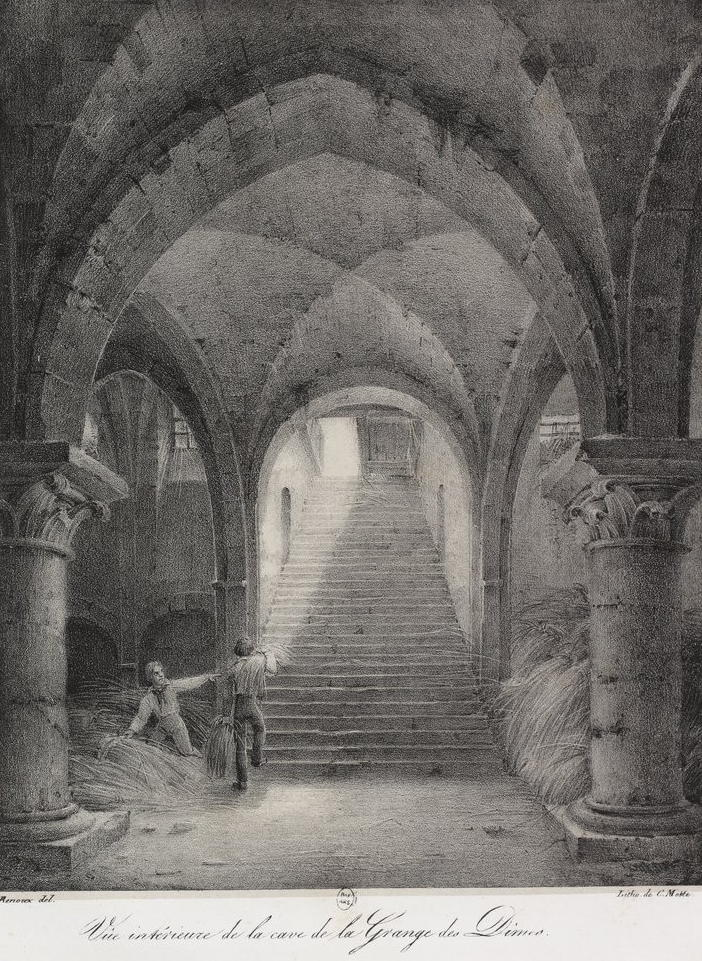
Vue Intérieur de la Cave de la Granges des Dîmes from the book Vues des Provins (1822)

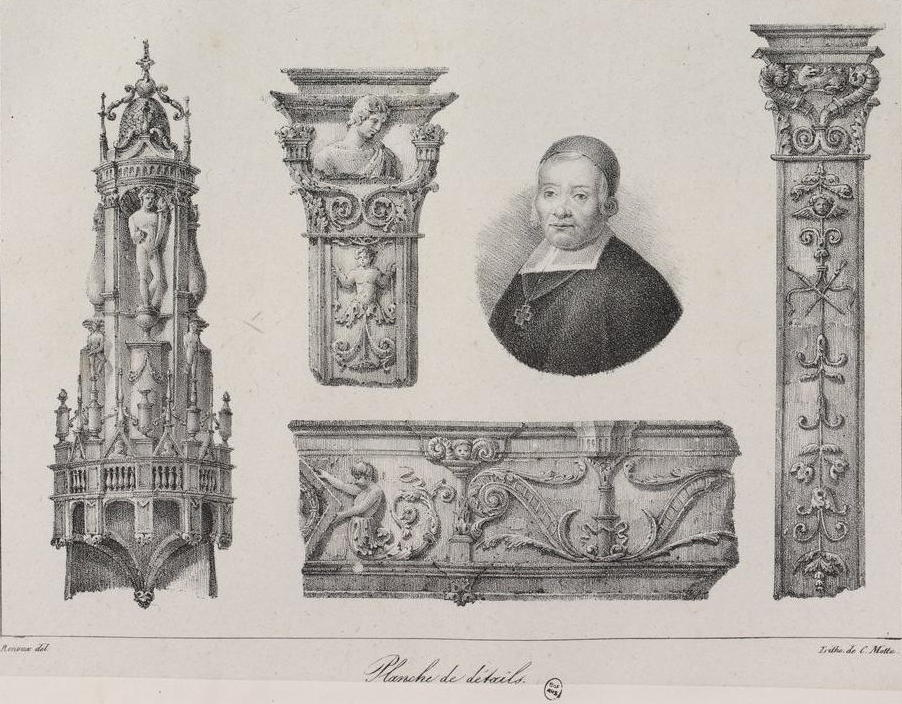
Planches des Détails from the book Vues des Provins (1822)

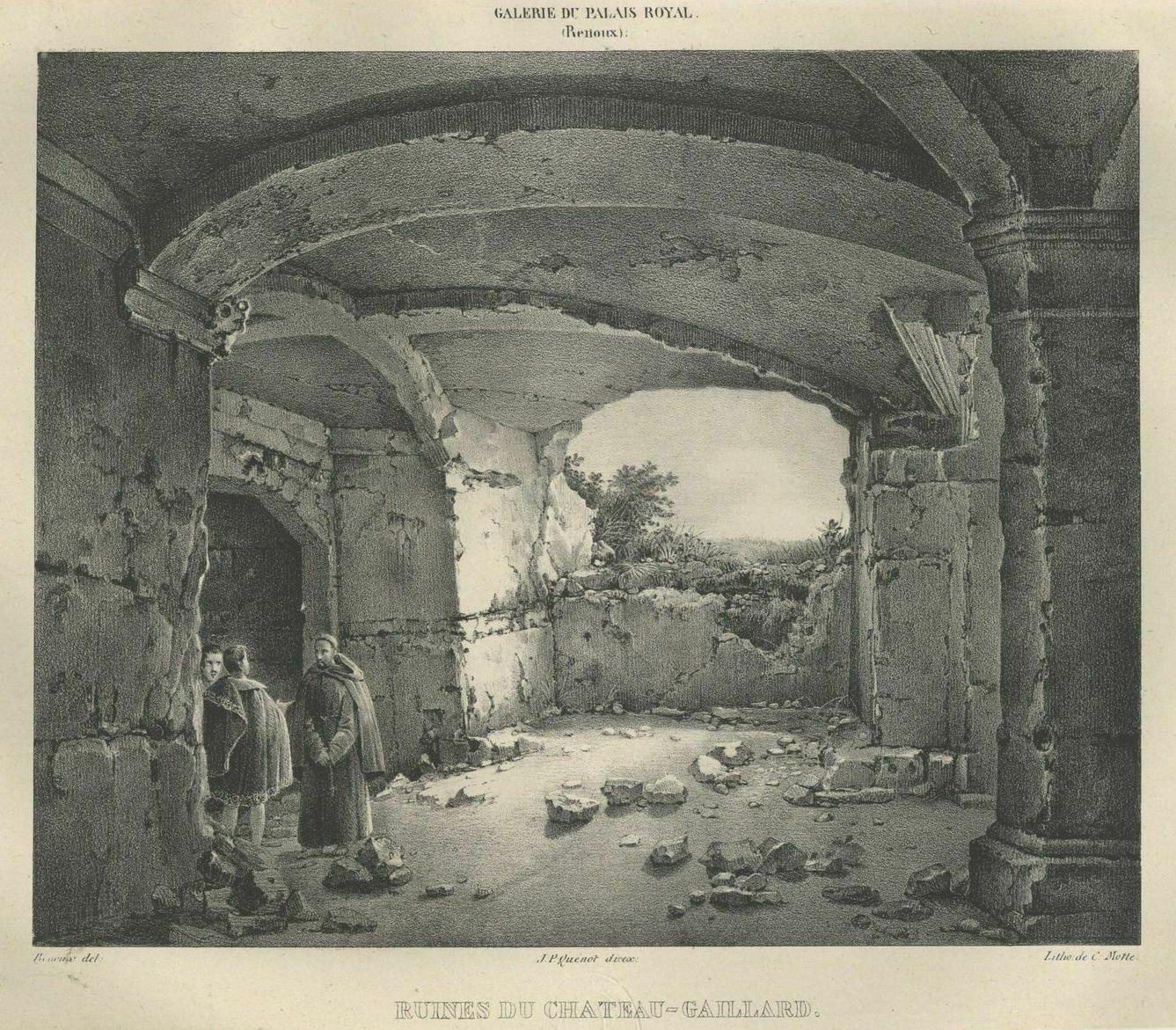
Ruines des Casemates du Château Gaillard (lithograph by C. Motte after the painting of 1822)

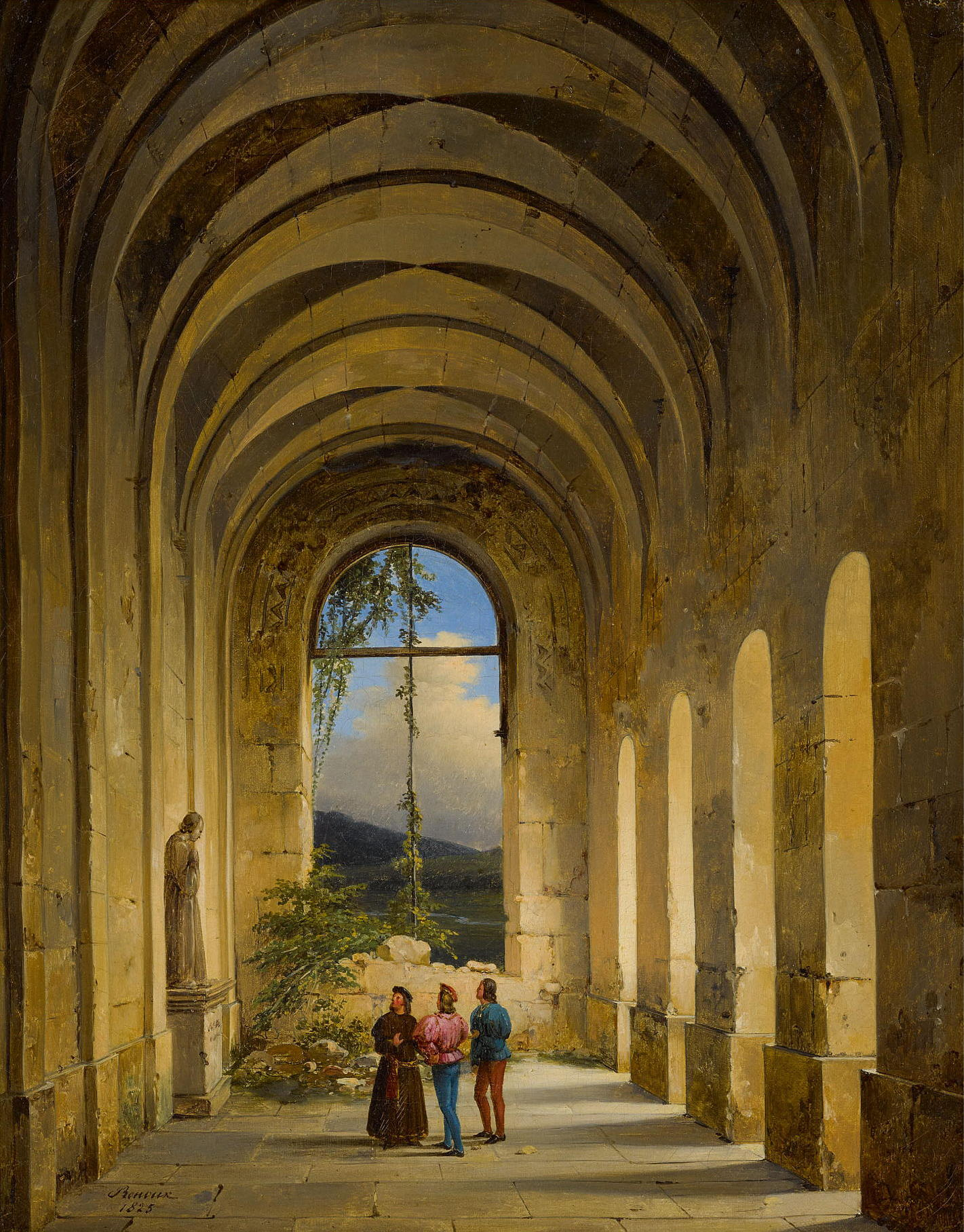
Conversation in a Medieval Cloister (1825, private collection)

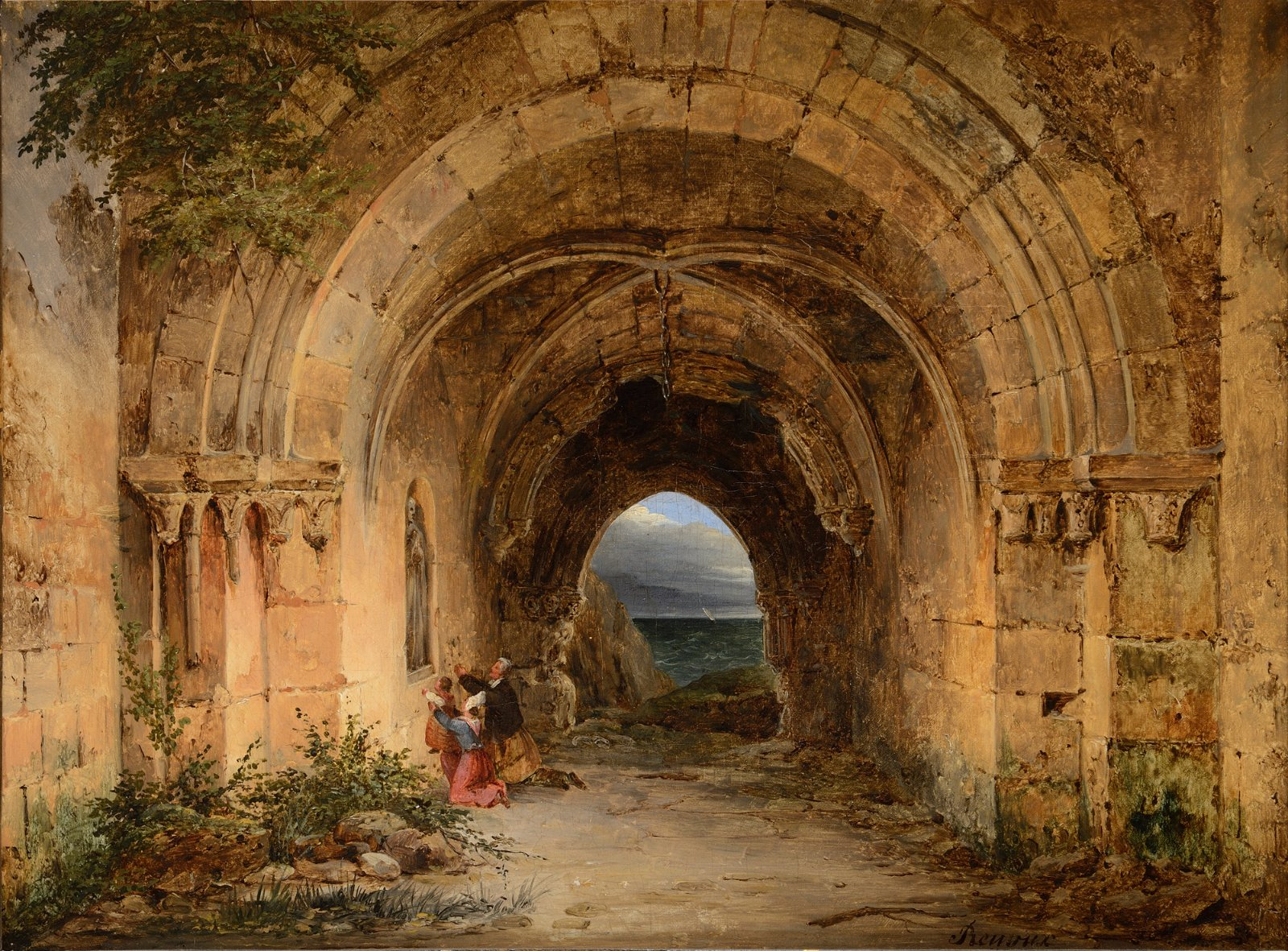
Pèlerins en prière dans les ruines d'une abbaye (1825)

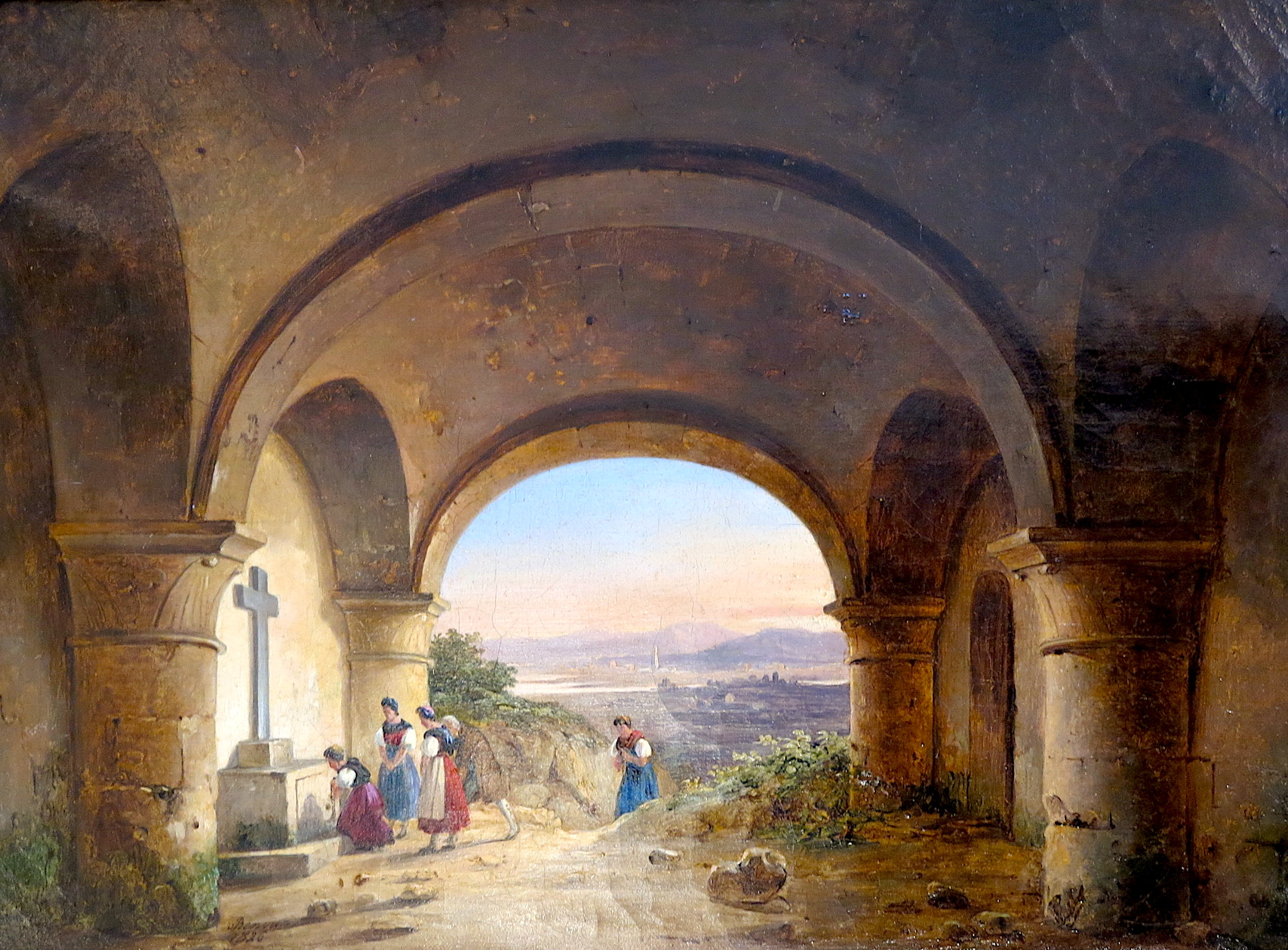
Le Pélerinage Sous la Crypte (1826, Galerie de Lardemelle, Paris)

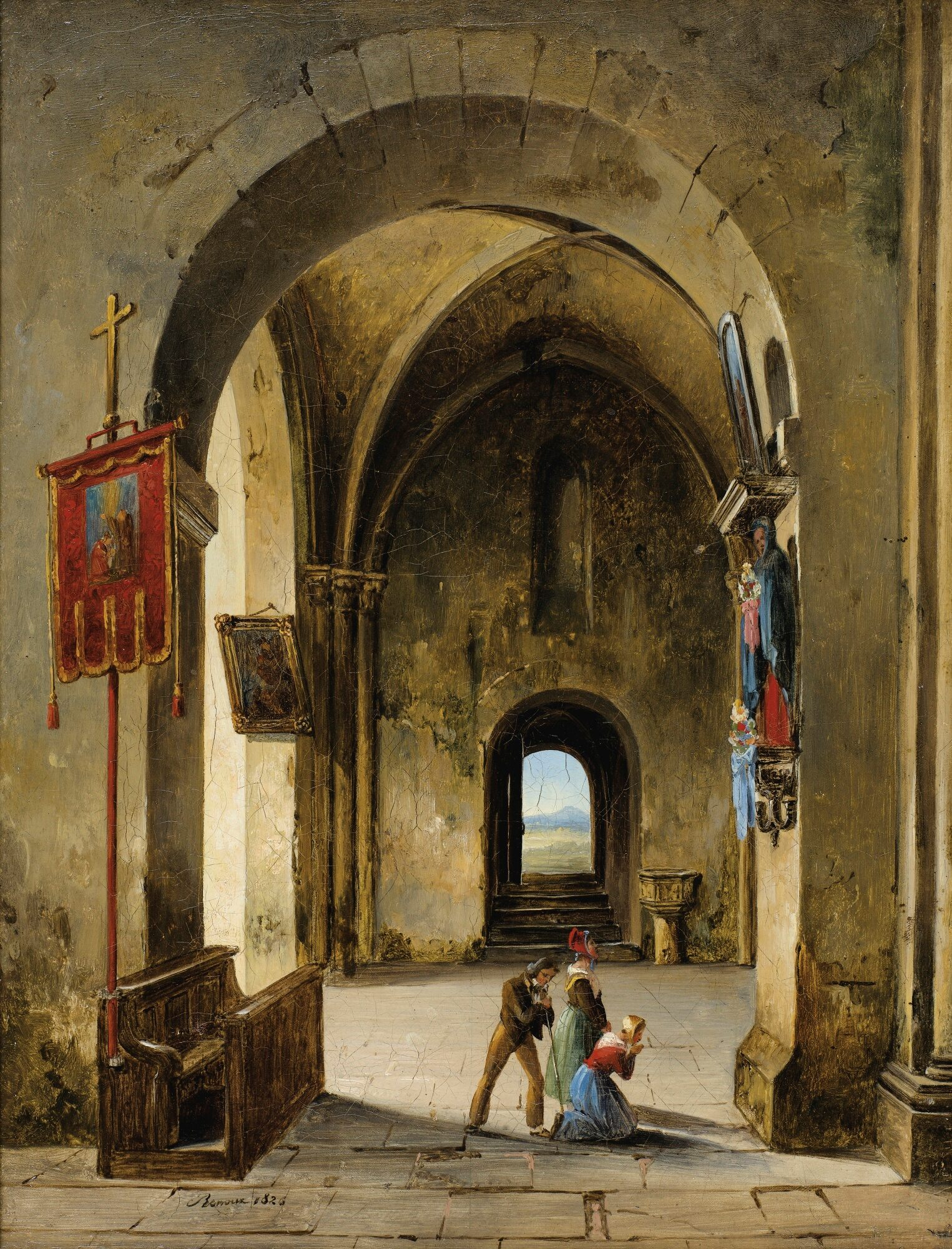
Priére dans L'Église (1826, private collection)

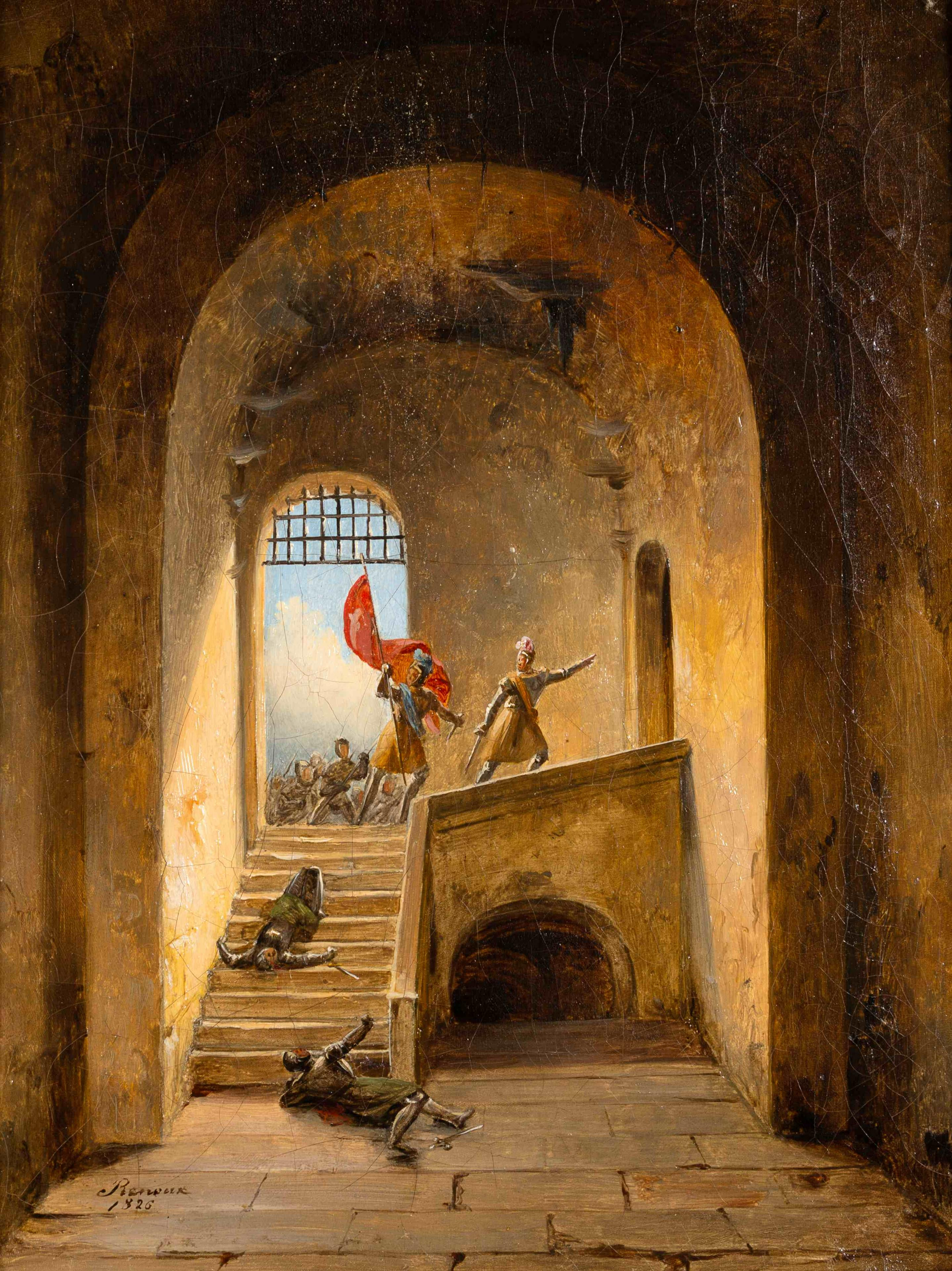
A battle scene (1826, private collection)

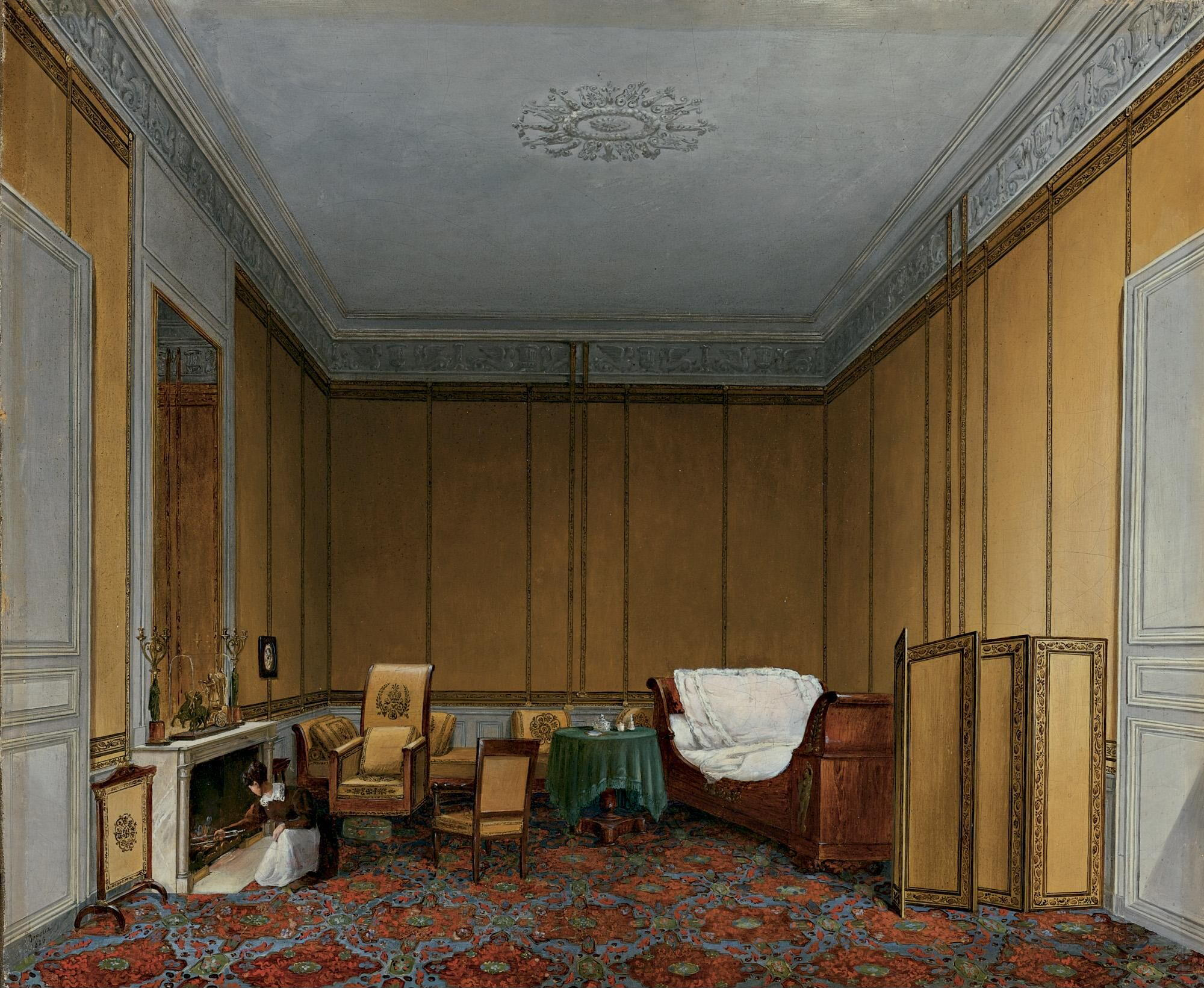
Interior of a Salon (1826, private collection)

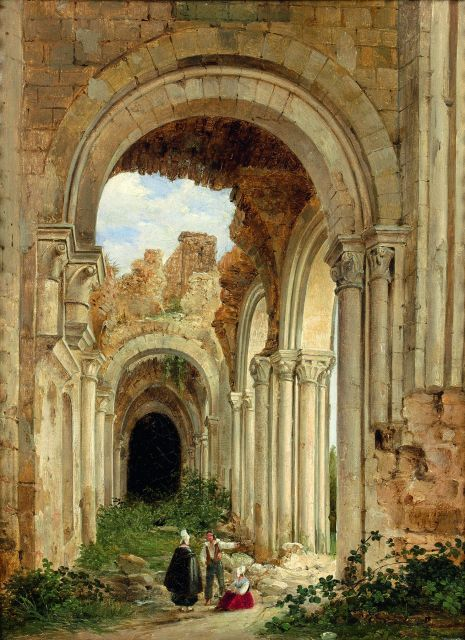
Ruines animées de personnages, (1827?, private collection)

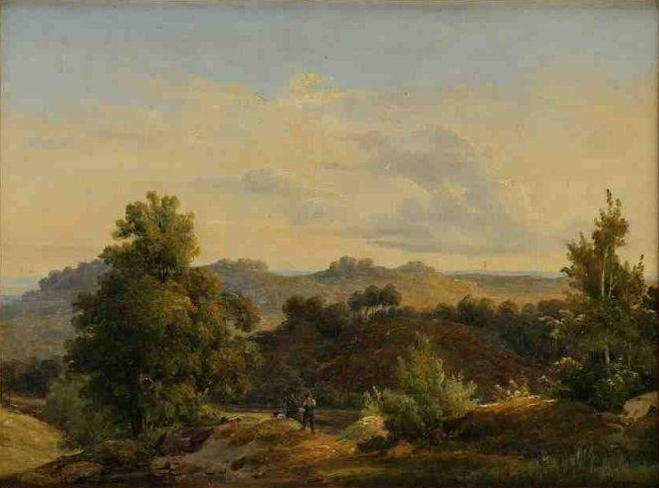
Walkers in a Hilly Landscape (1828?)

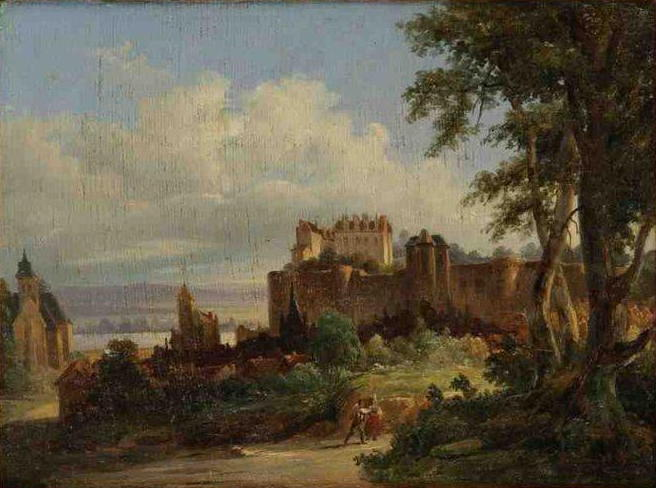
Walkers Near a Château (1829)

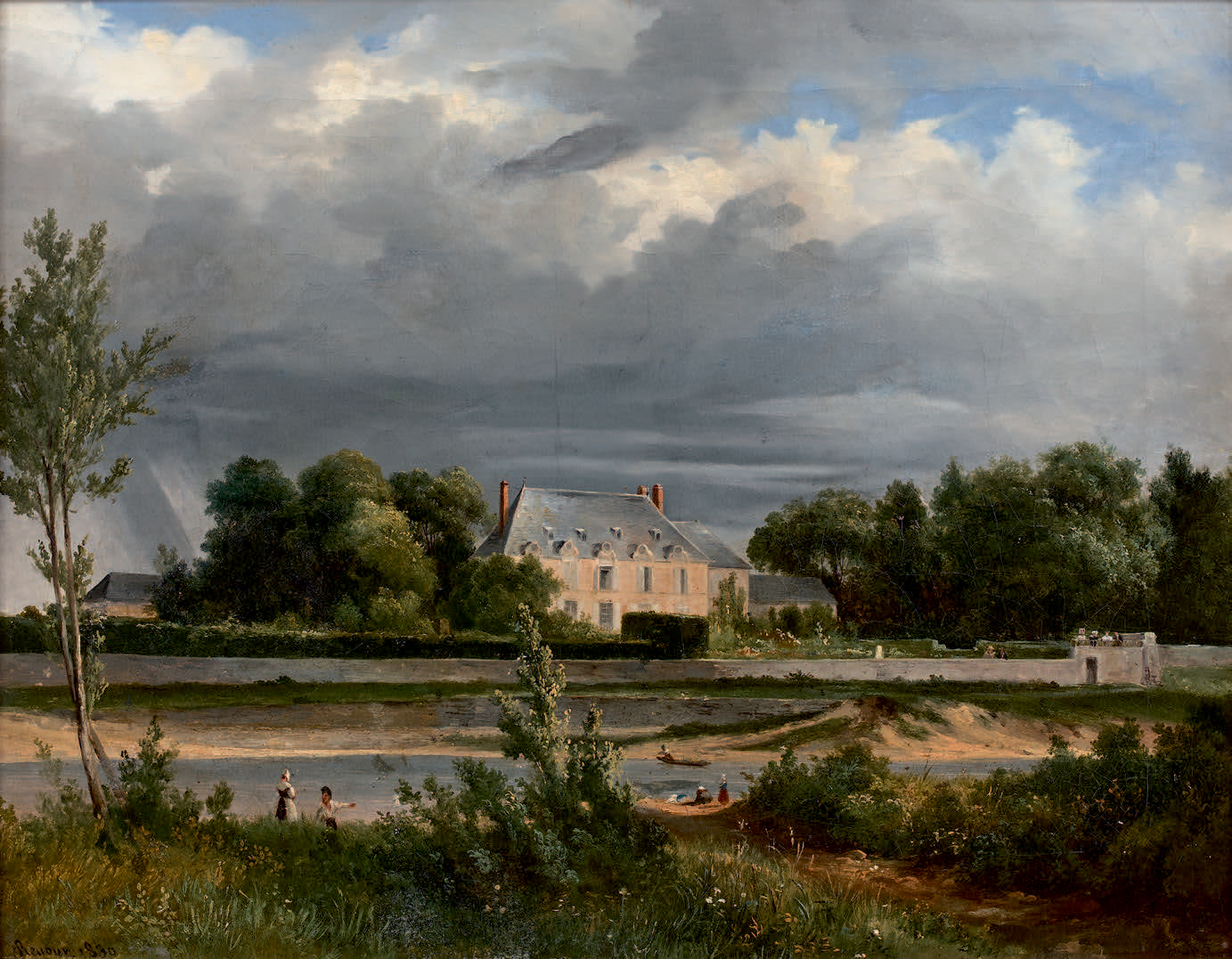
Vue d'une propriété près d'une rivière (1830)

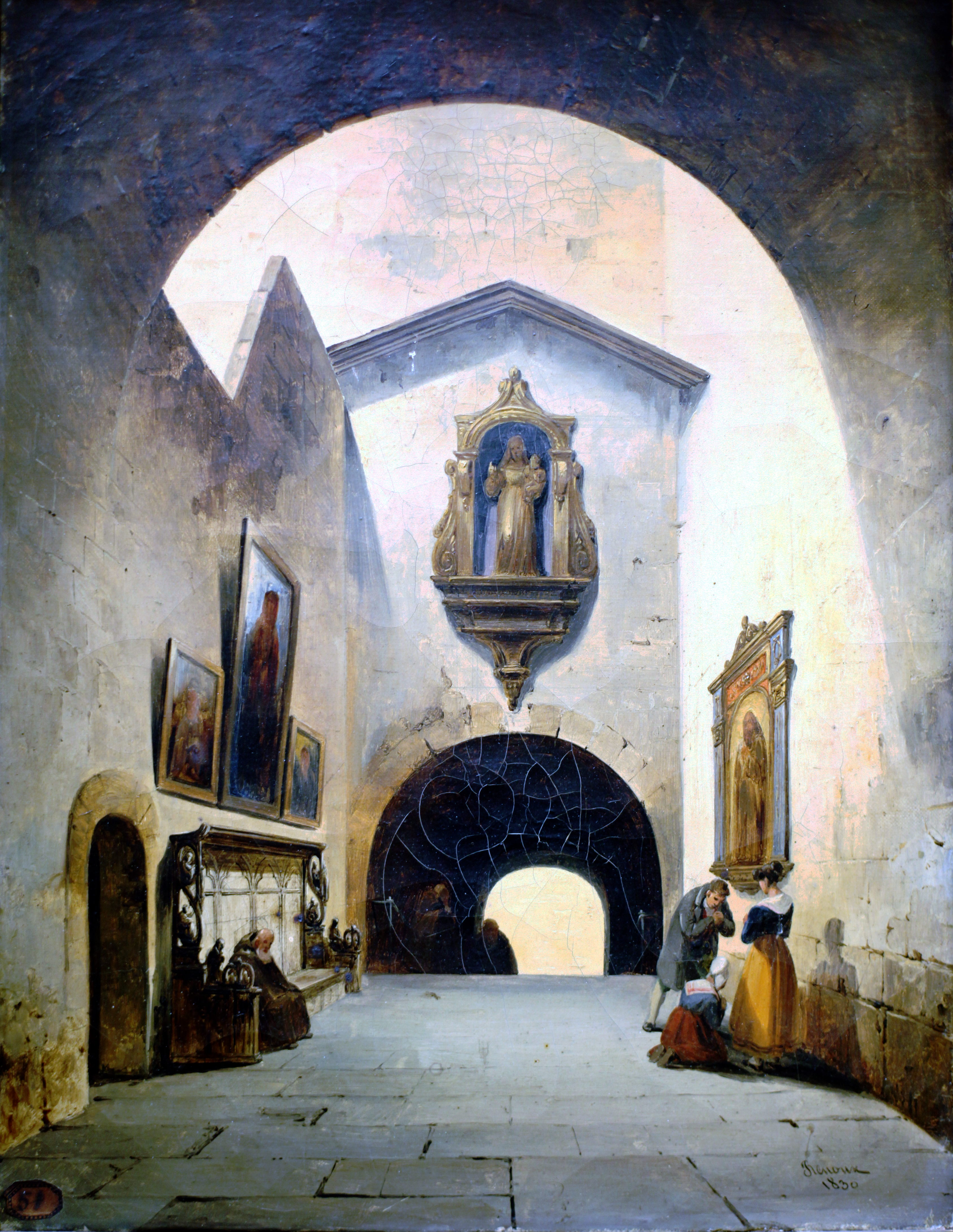
Intérieur de Cloître (1830, Musée Lambinet, Versailles)

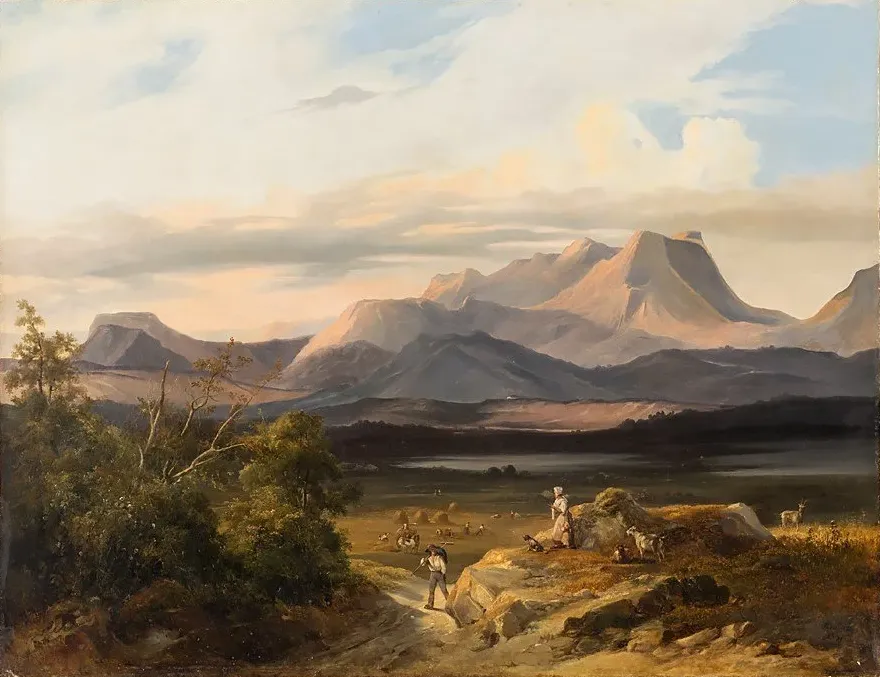
mountain landscape (1831, private collection)

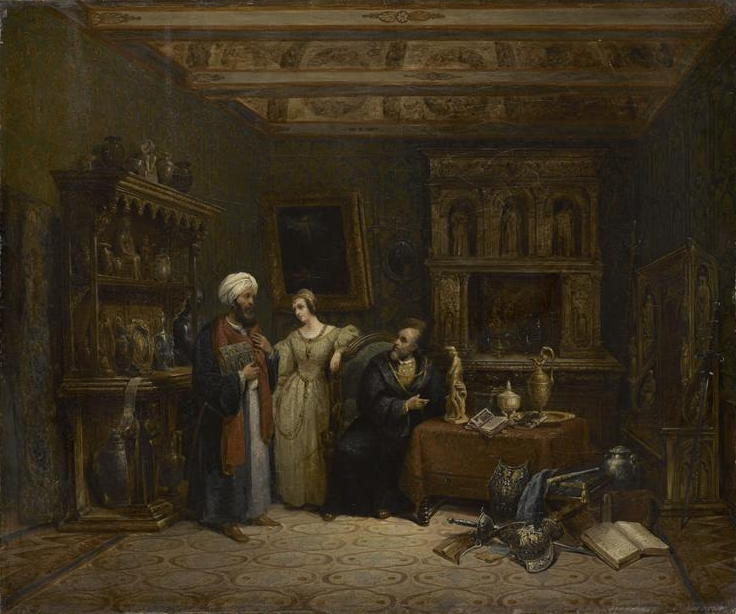
Intérieur d'une Chambre au XVIe Siècle (1831, Musée National du Château de Compiègne)

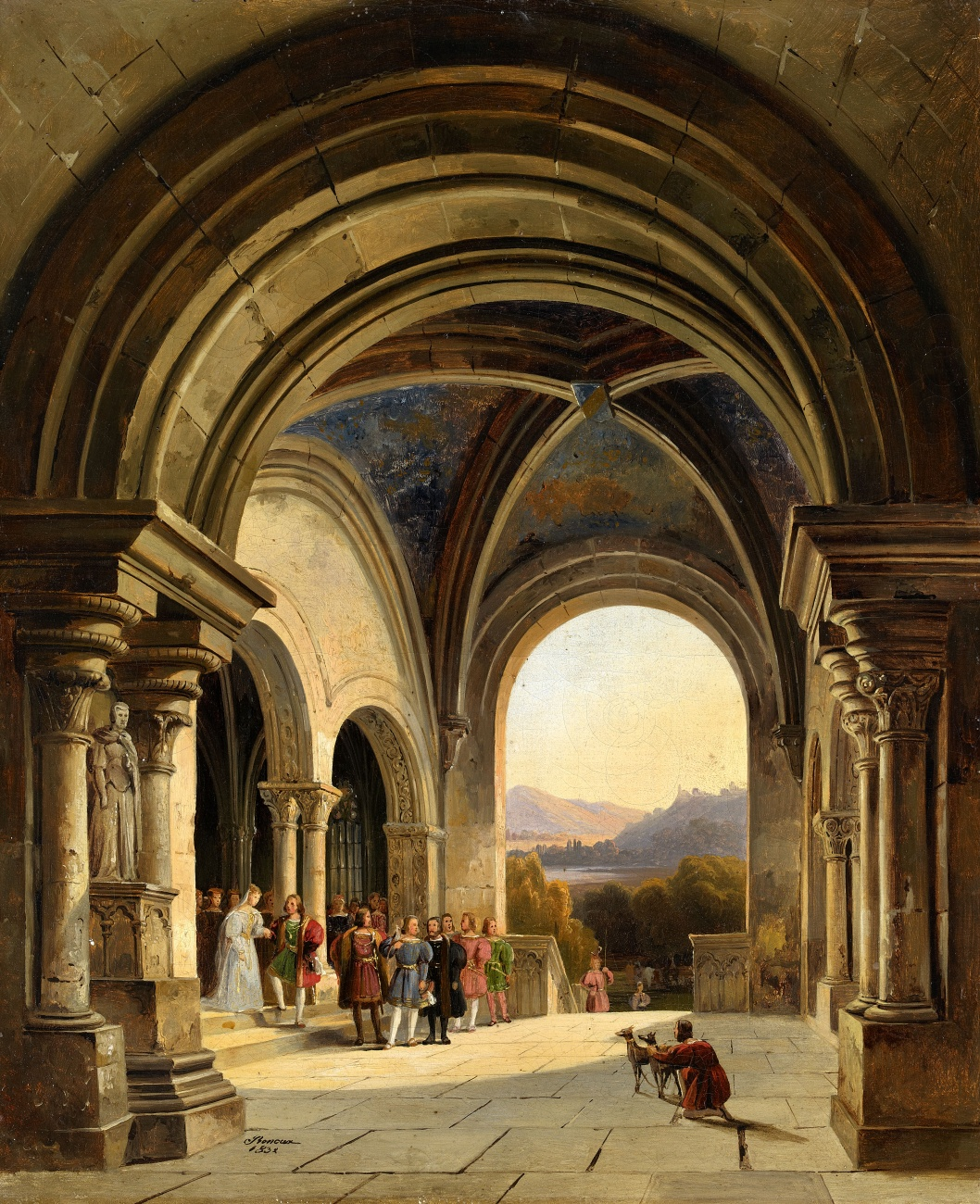
Departing Hunt Party (1832, private collection)

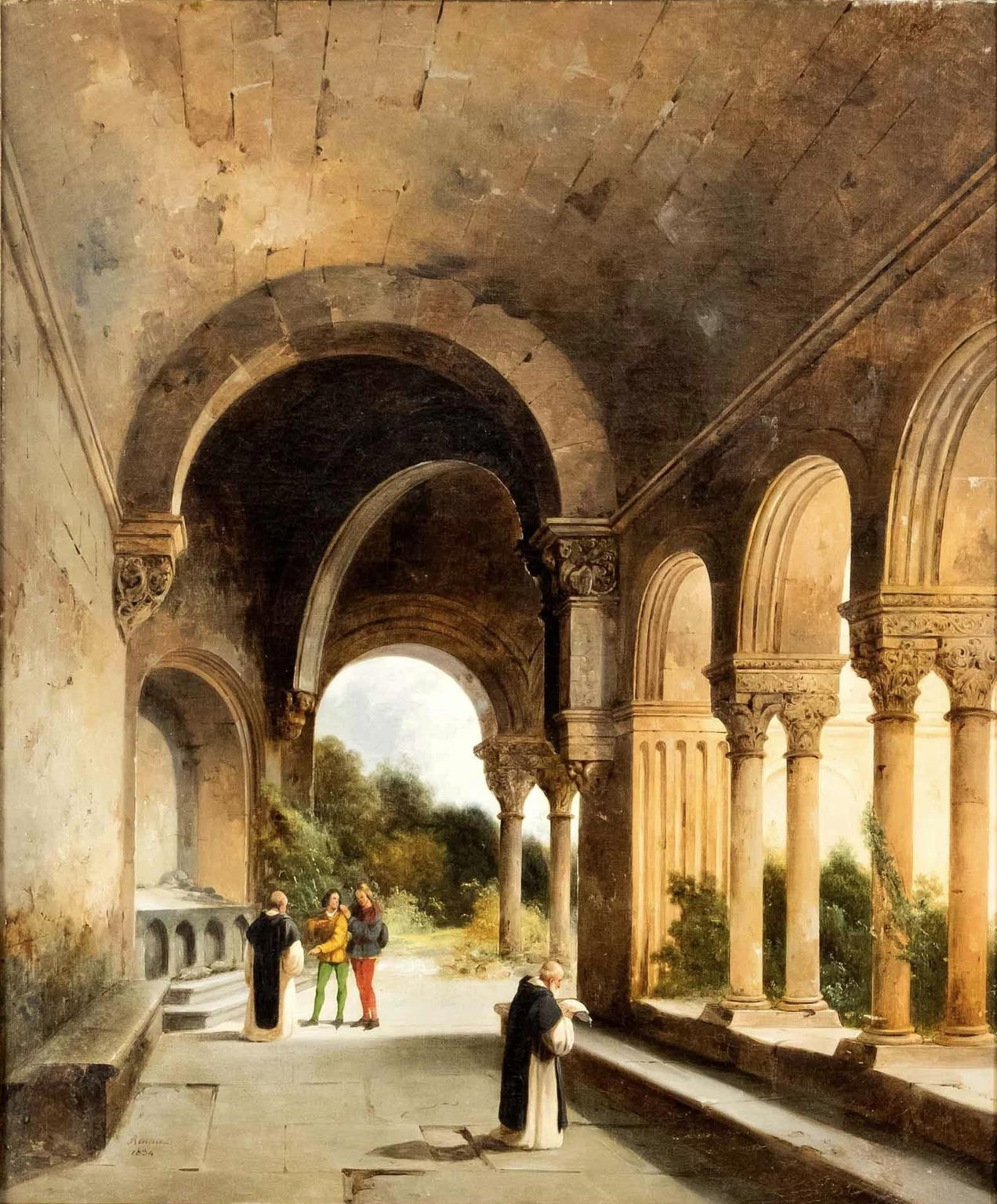
Two Young Noblemen in the Cloister of a Monastery with Two Dominican Monks (1834, private collection)

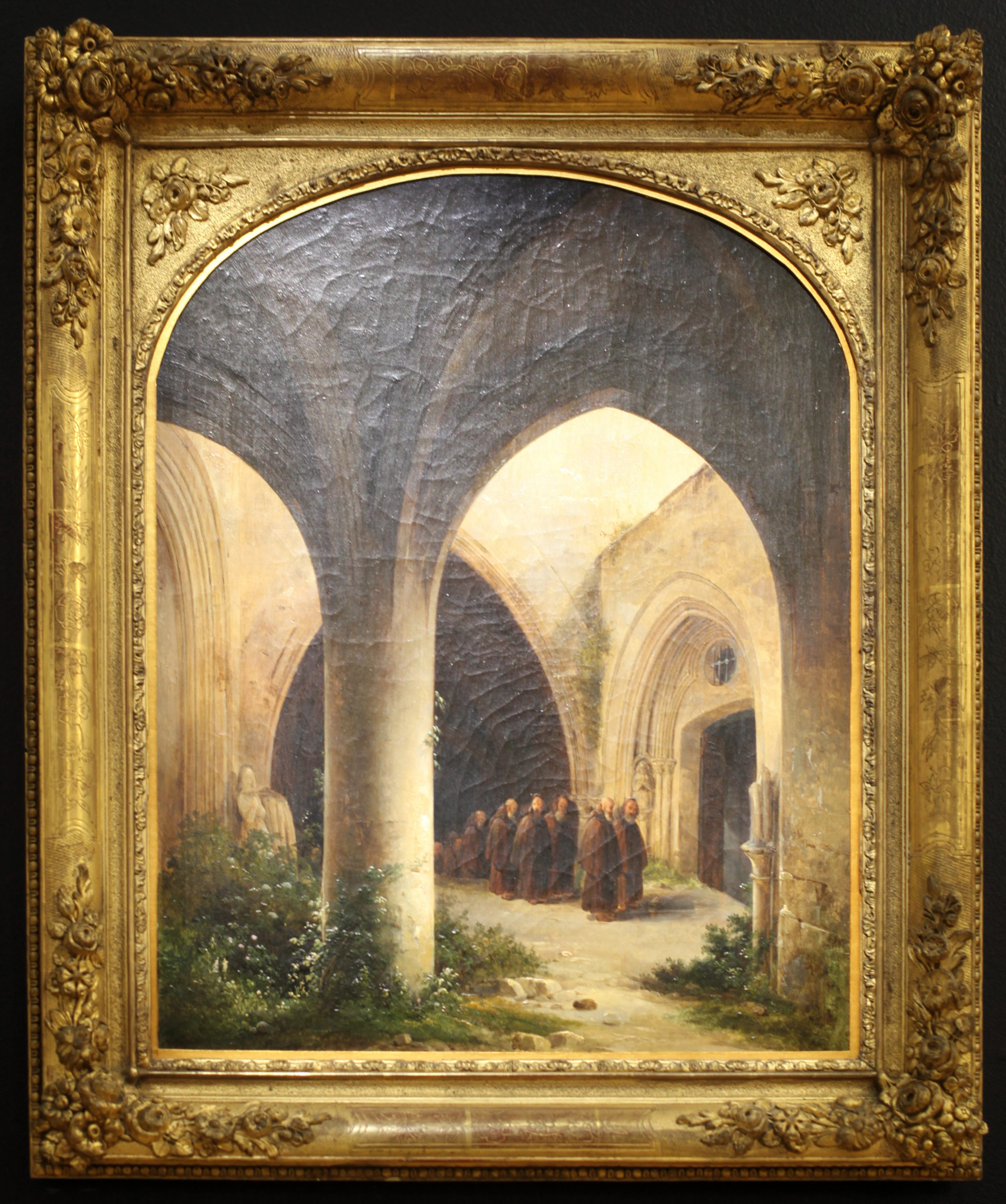
Le Cloître de Saint-Sever près de Rouen (1835, Musée Lambinet, Versailles)

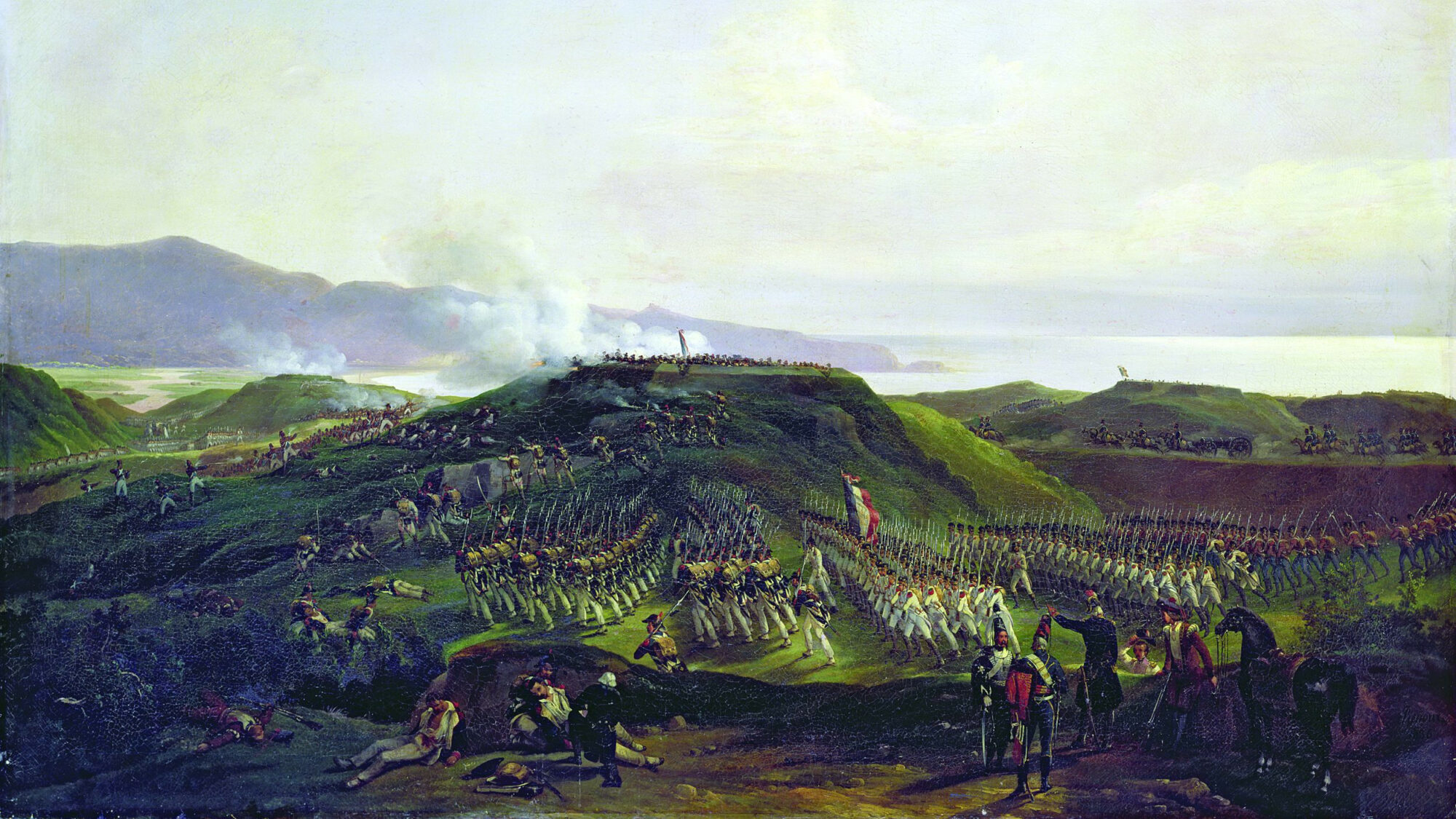
Bataille de la Croix des Bouquets, 23 Juin 1794 (1836, Musée National des Châteaux de Versailles et de Trianon)

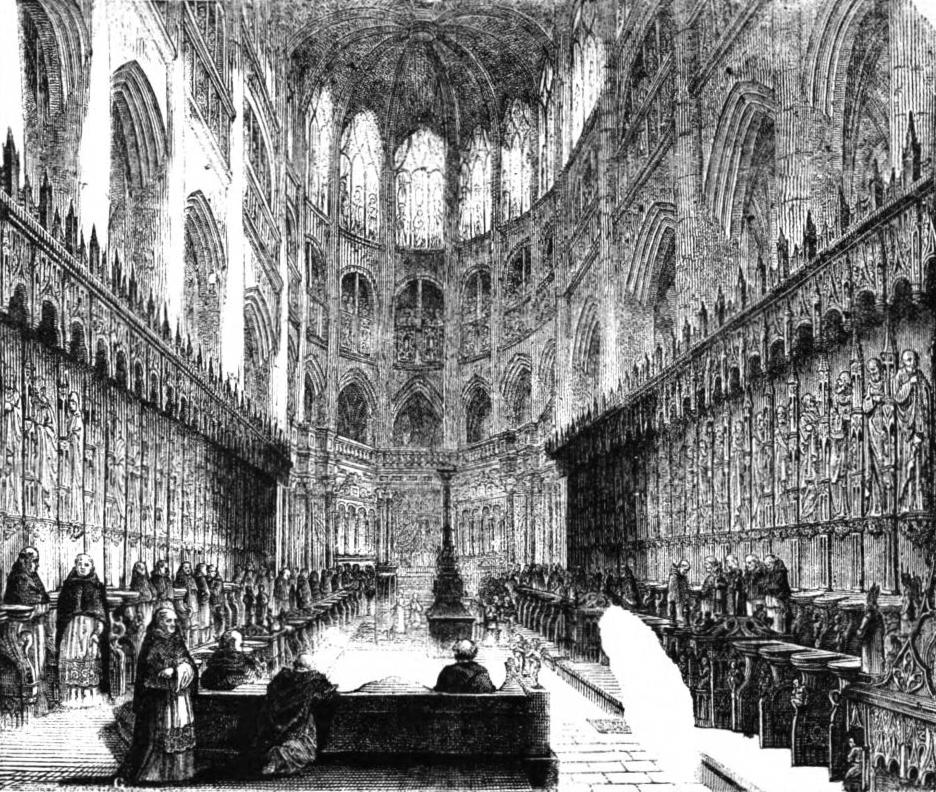
Interior of the Cathedral at Auch (etching from painting of 1838)

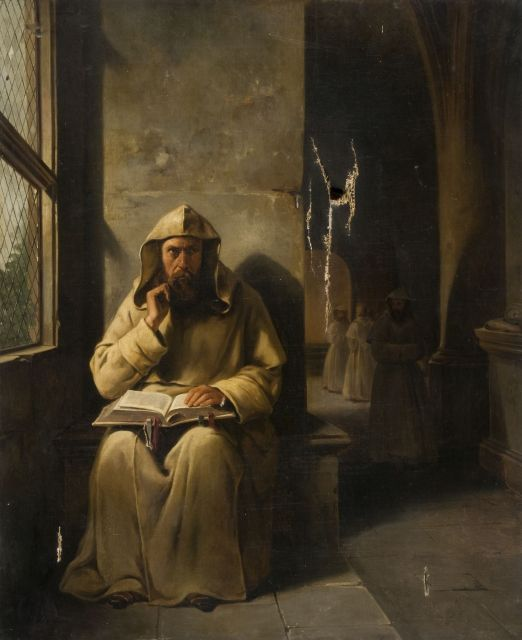
Carthusian Monk (1839, private collection)

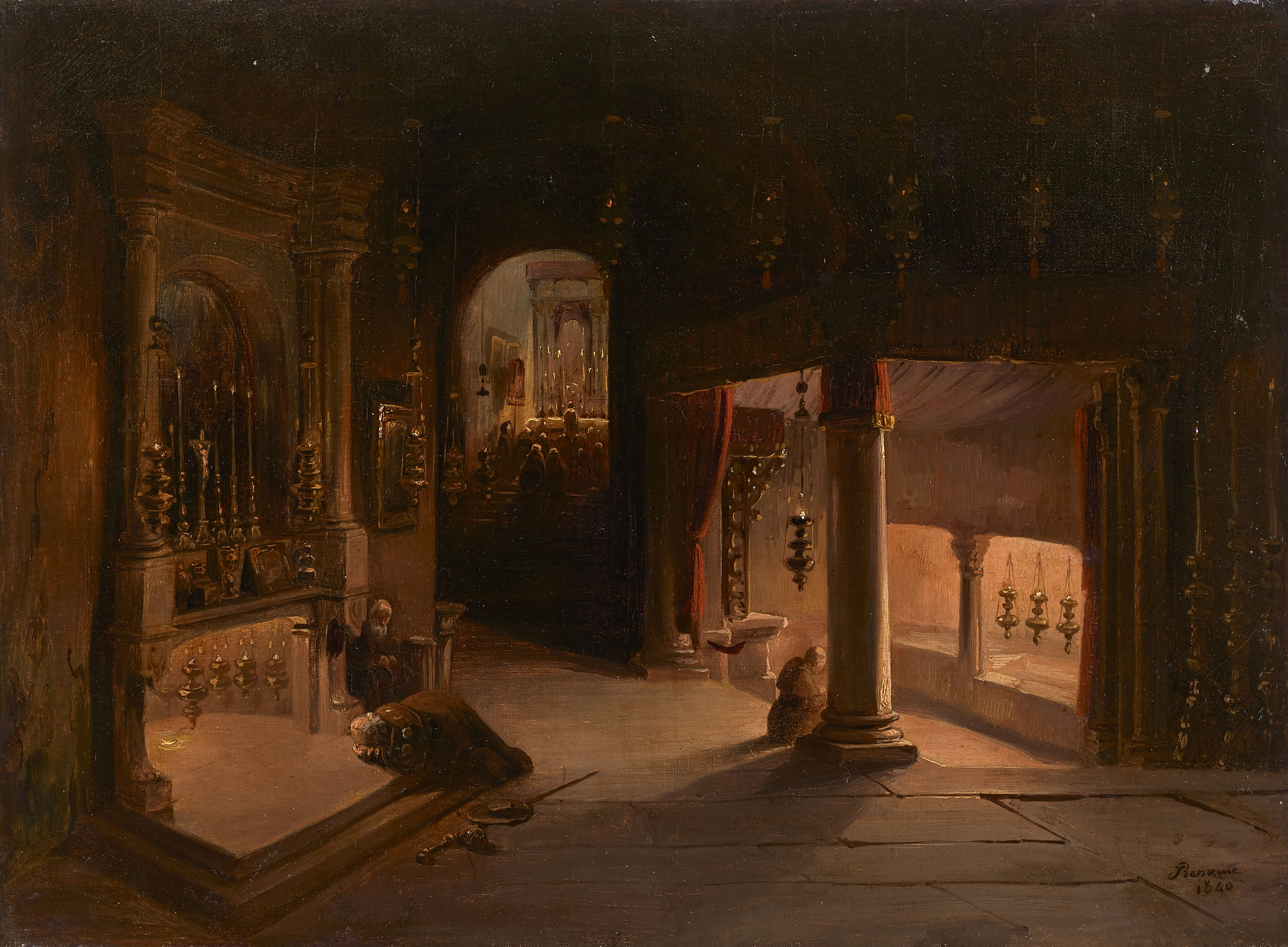
Pèlerins en Prière, (1840, private collection)

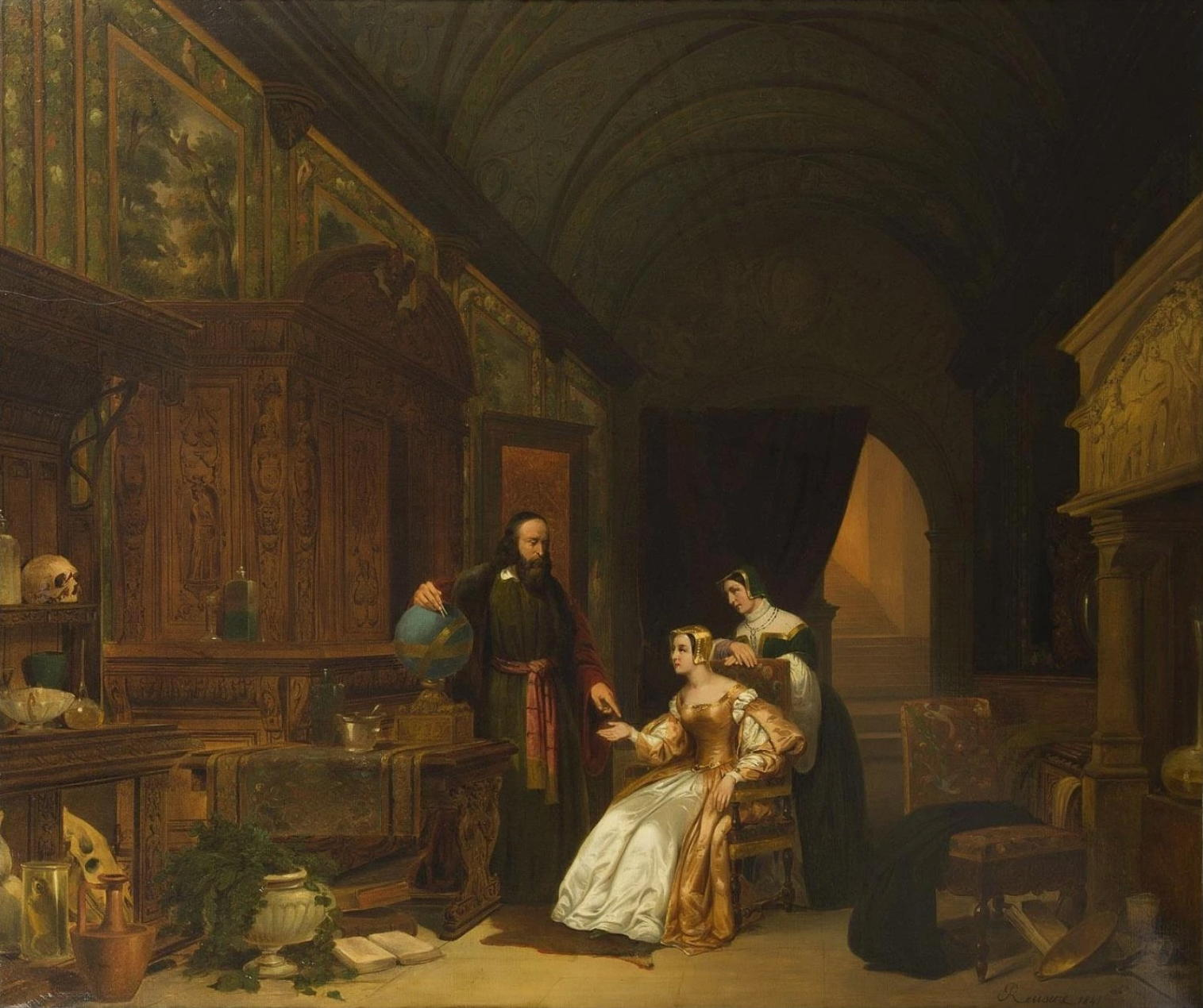
L'Astrologue (1841, private collection)

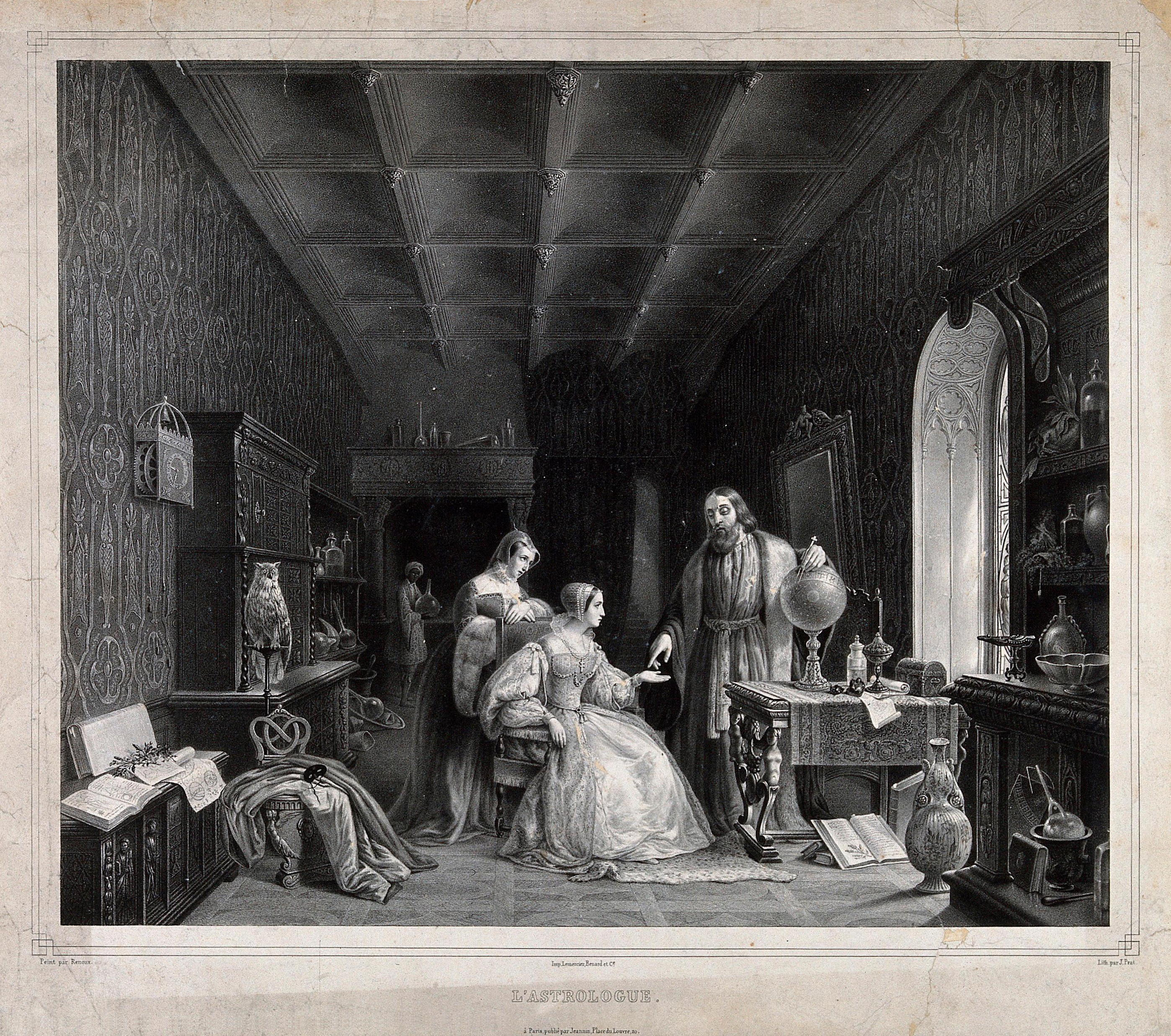
L'Astrologue, lithograph by J. Prat, (after 1841, Wellcome Collection)

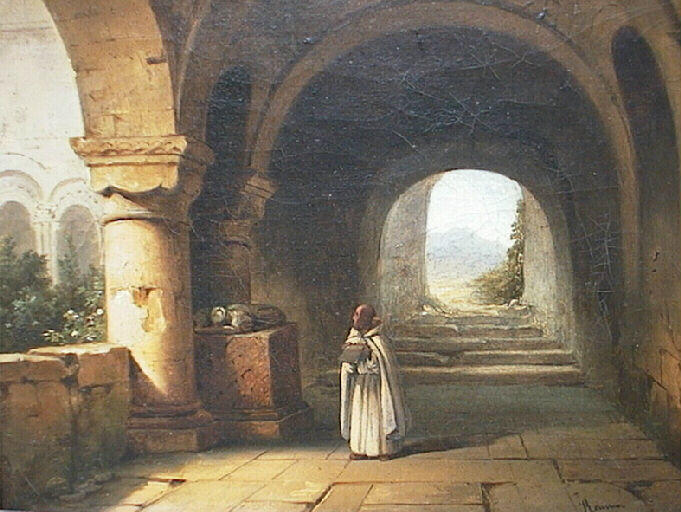
Galerie d'un Cloître (1841, Musée d'Art et d'Histoire, Lisieux)

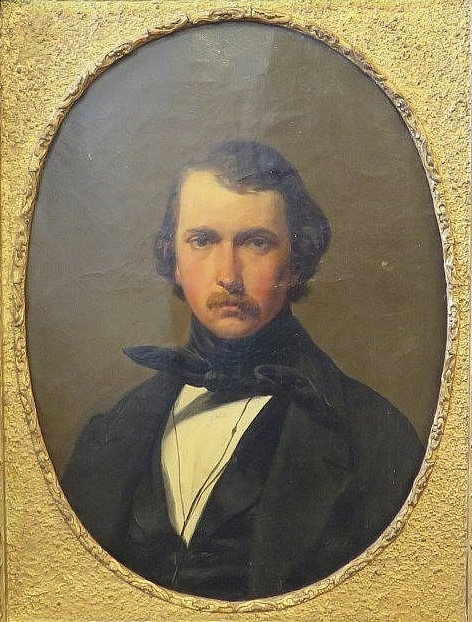
Portrait of Henri-Gustave Saltzmann (1841, private collection; Saltzmann was a student of Renoux)

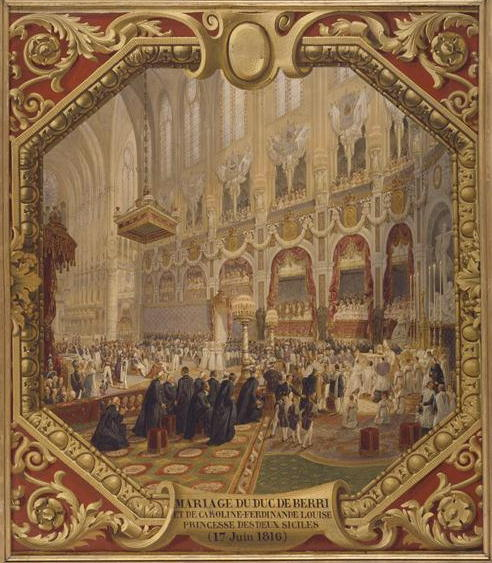
Mariage du Duc de Berry et de Caroline, Princesse des Deux-Siciles, le 17 Juin 1816 (1843, Musée National des Châteaux de Versailles et de Trianon)

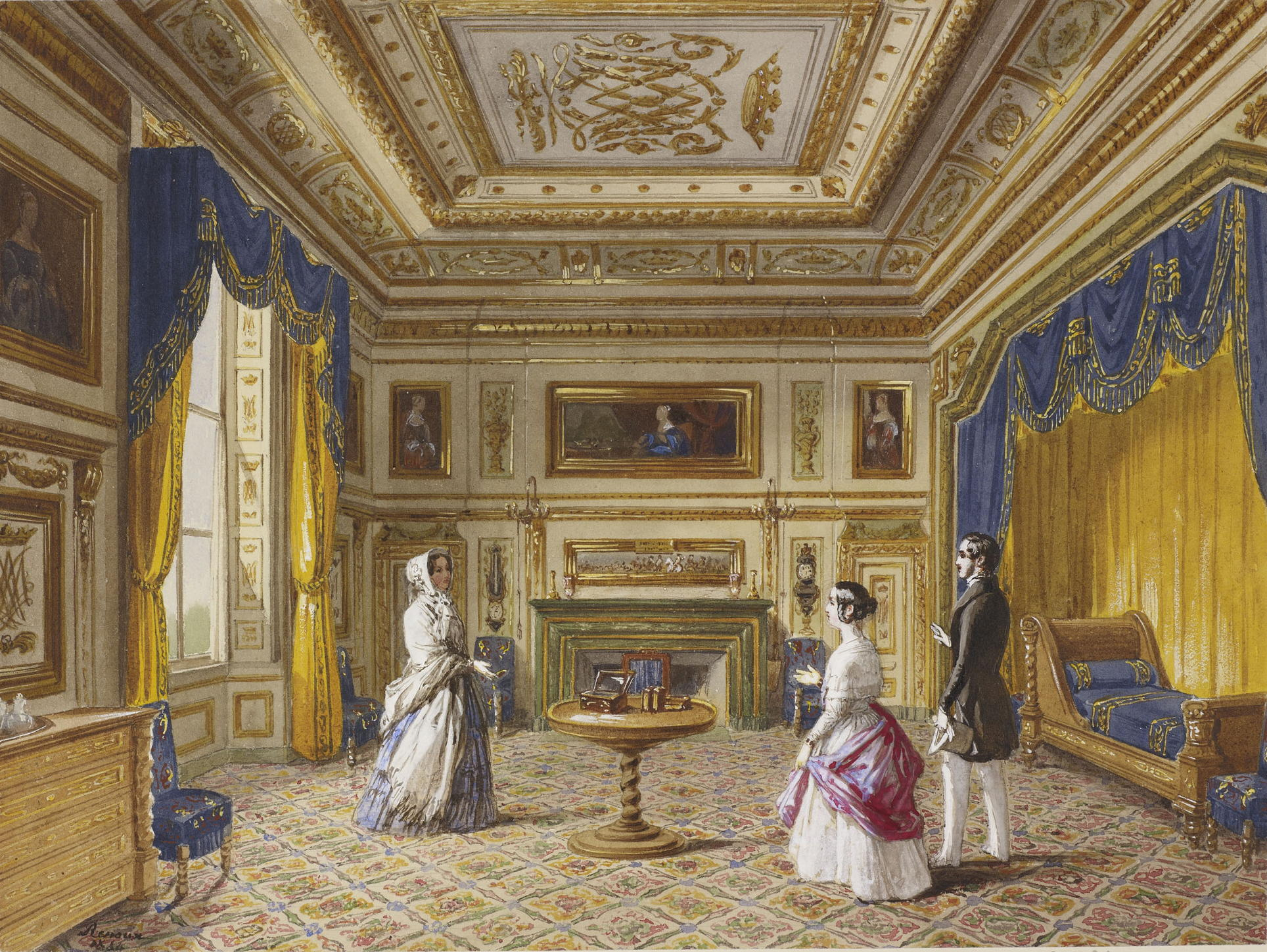
Royal Visit to Louis-Philippe: Bedroom of Madame Adélaide at the Château d'Eu (1844, figures inserted by Winterhalter, Royal Collection Trust)

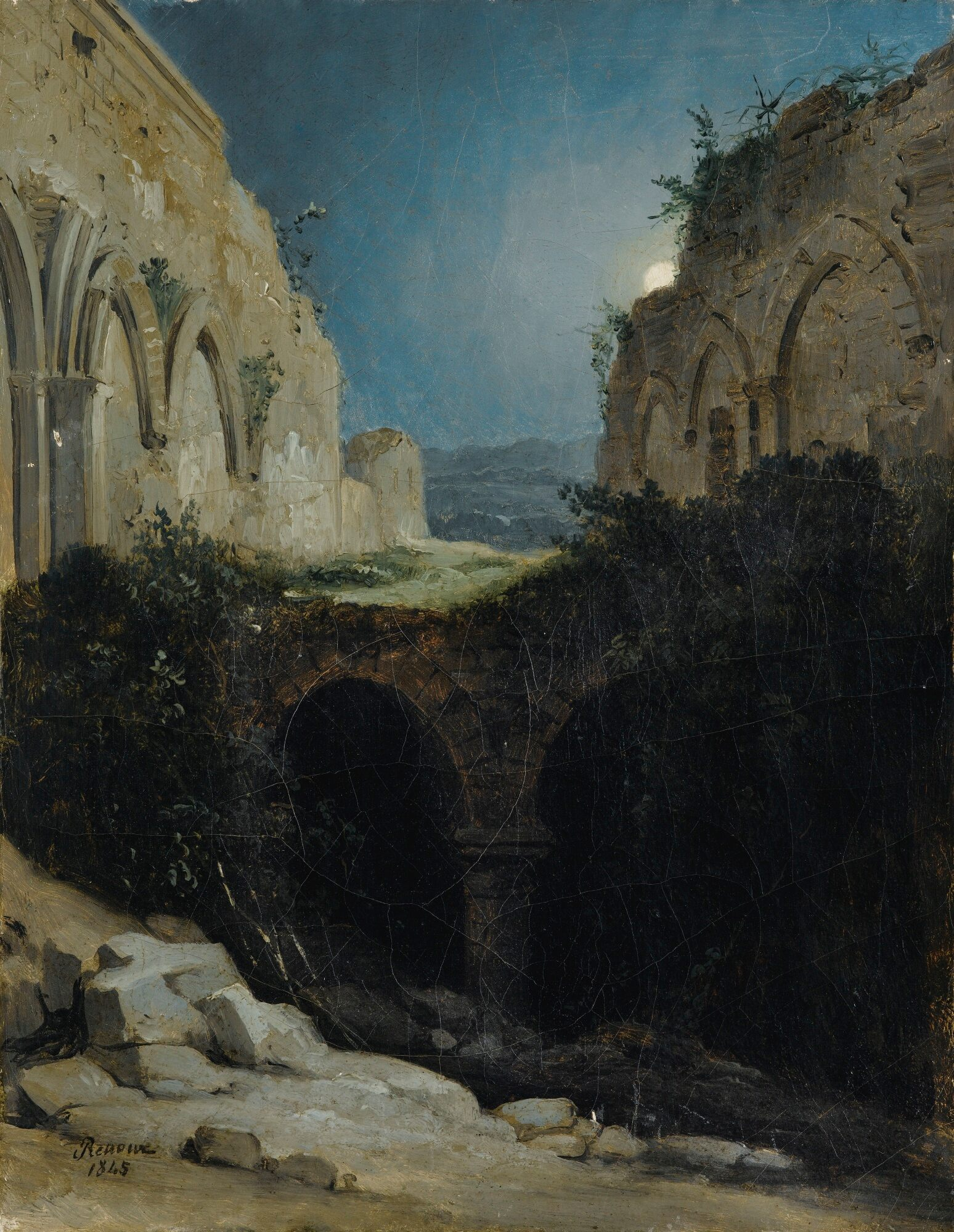
Paysage Nocturne avec les Ruines d'une Église (1845)

== Gallery (undated works) ==
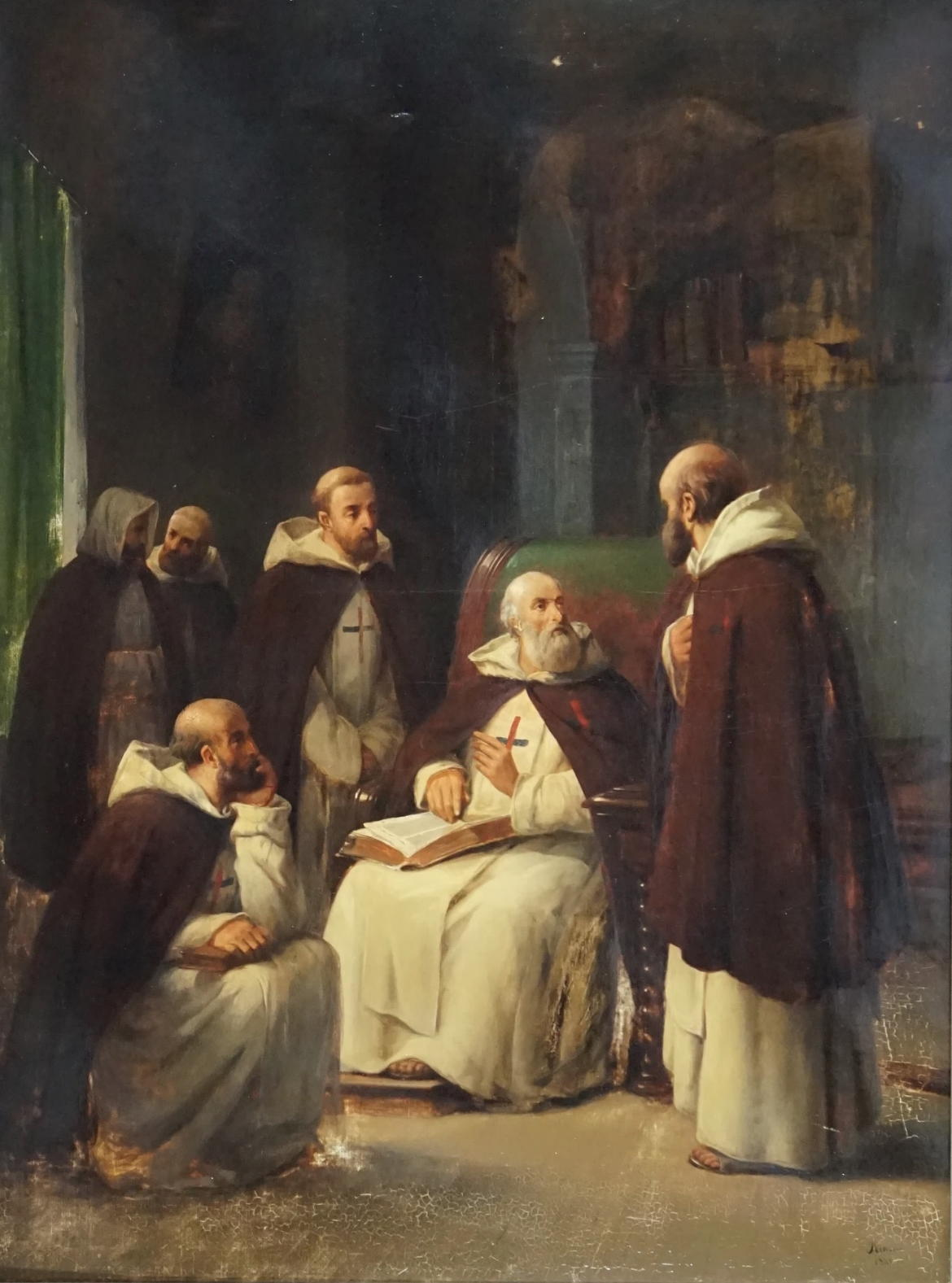
La lecture sainte (date illegible)

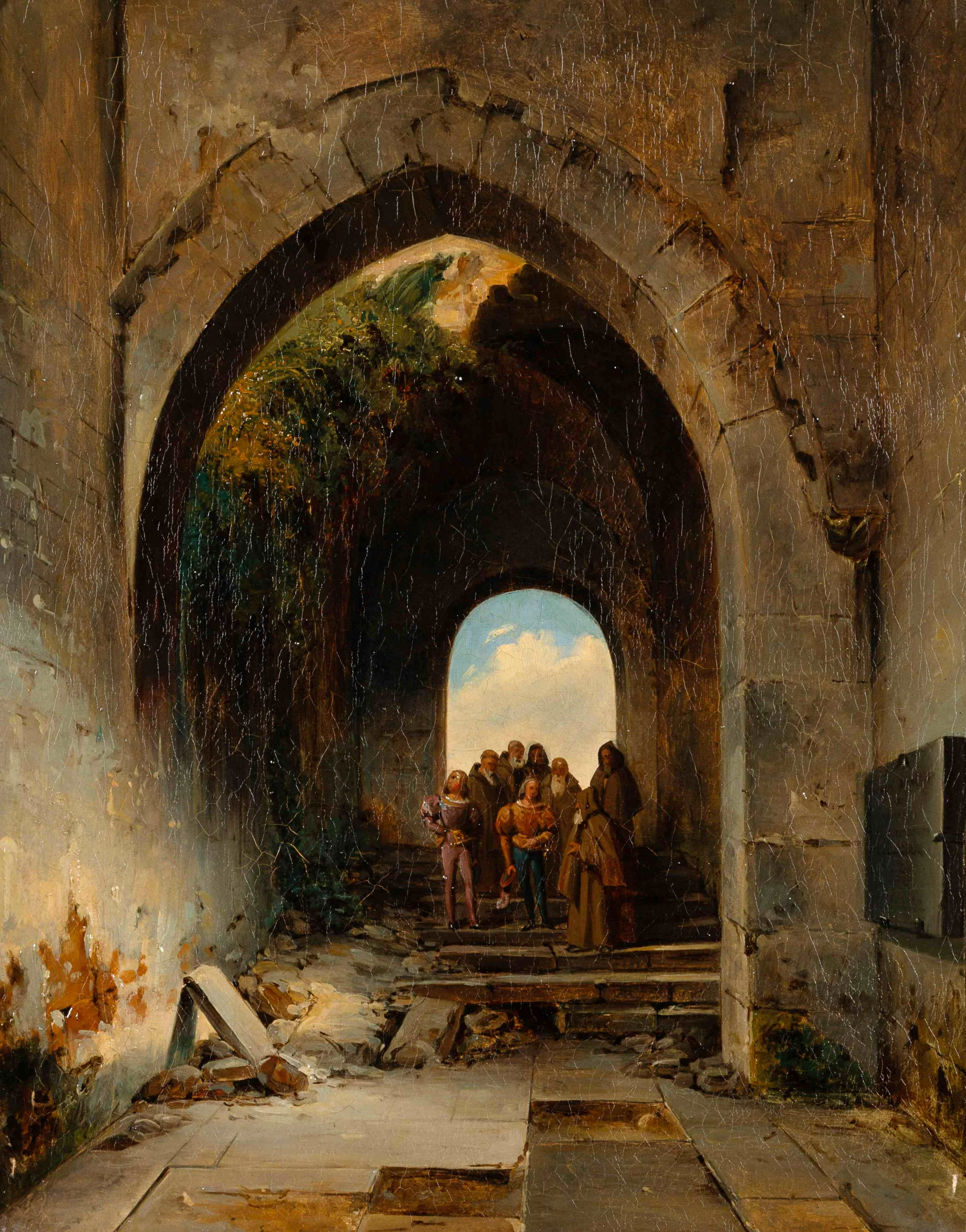
monks and young men amid ruins (undated, private collection)

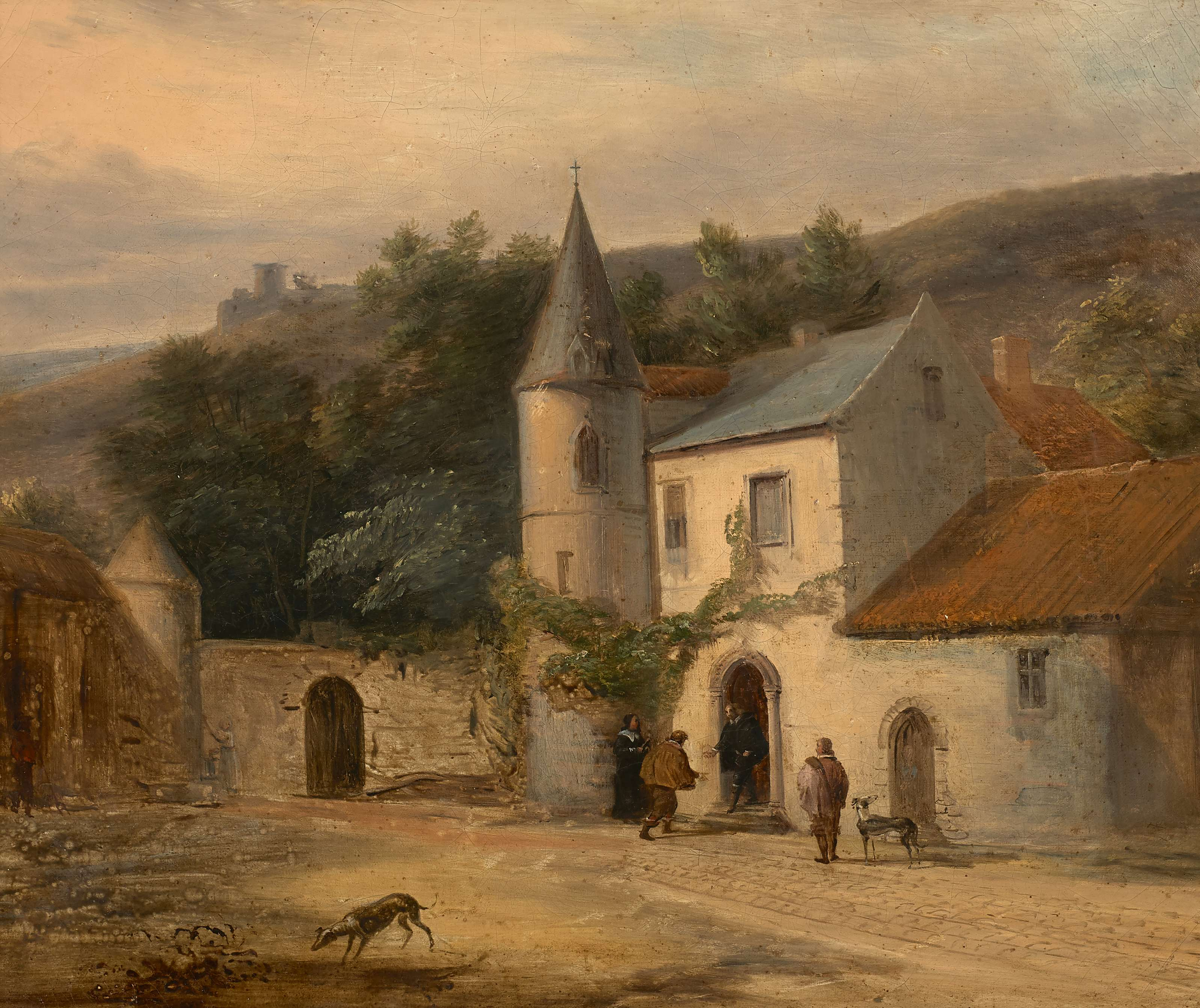
Scène animée devant une chapell (undated, private collection)

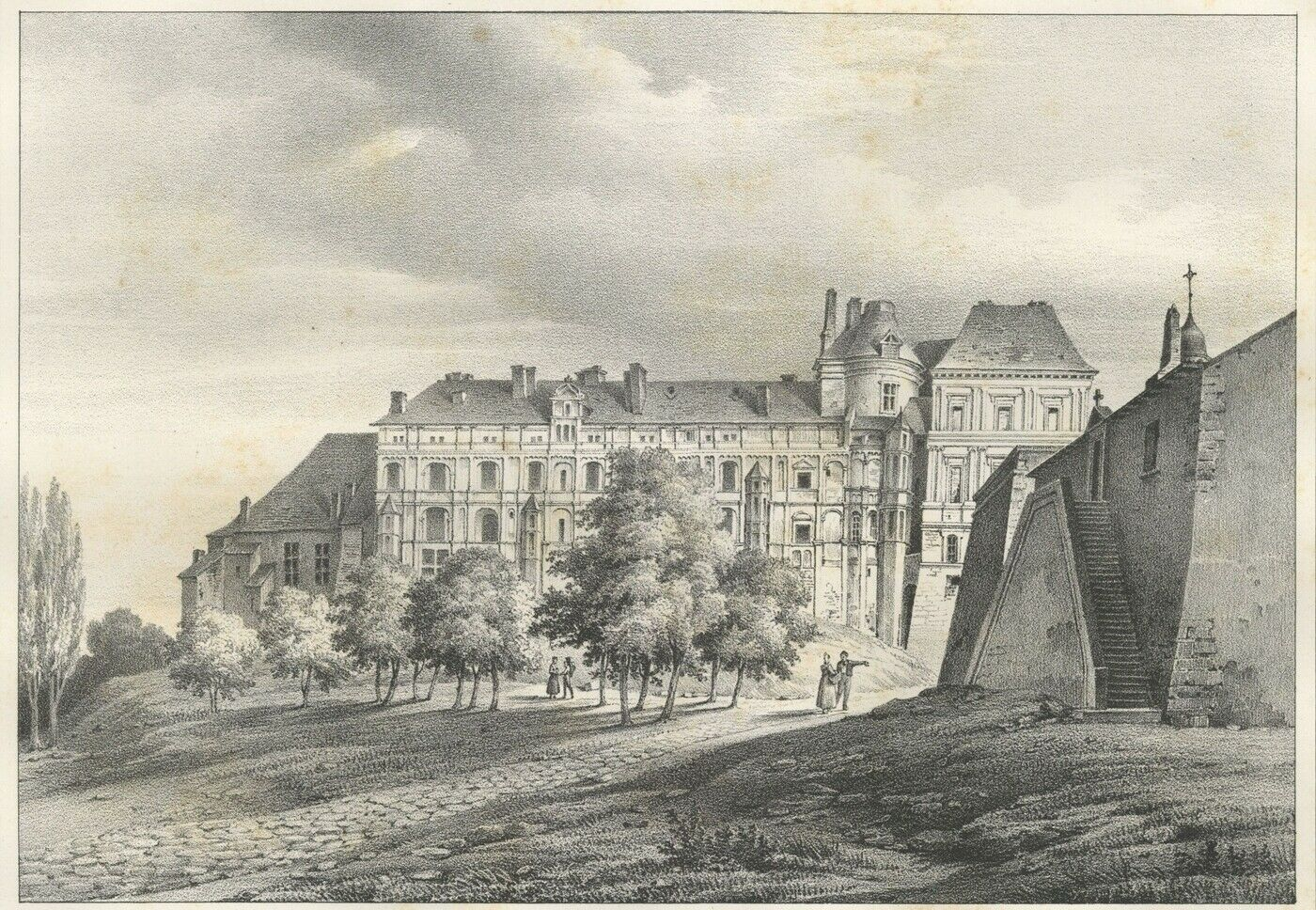
Château de Blois, lithograph by C. Motte from a drawing by Renoux

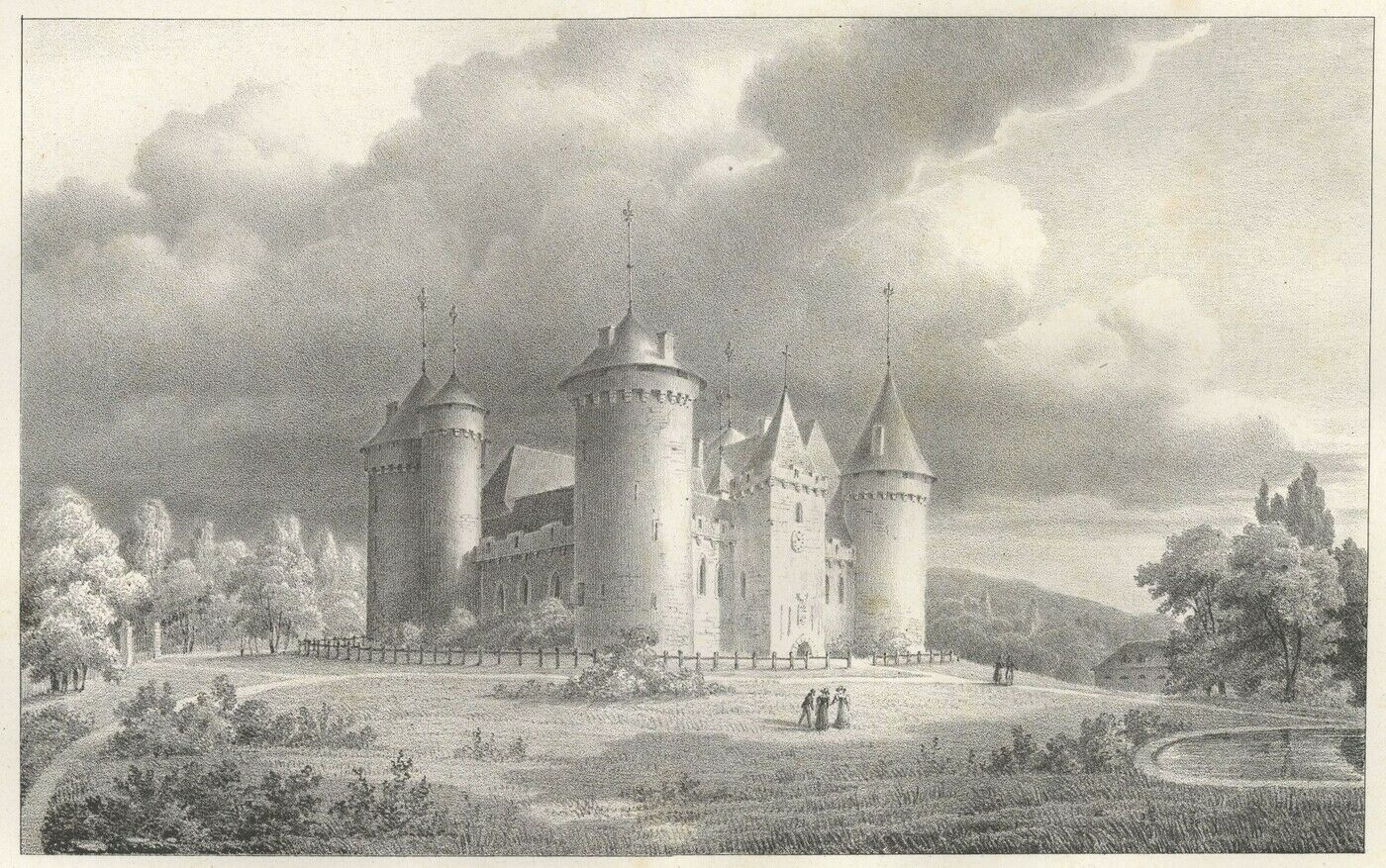
Château de Bonneval, lithograph by C. Motte from a drawing by Renoux

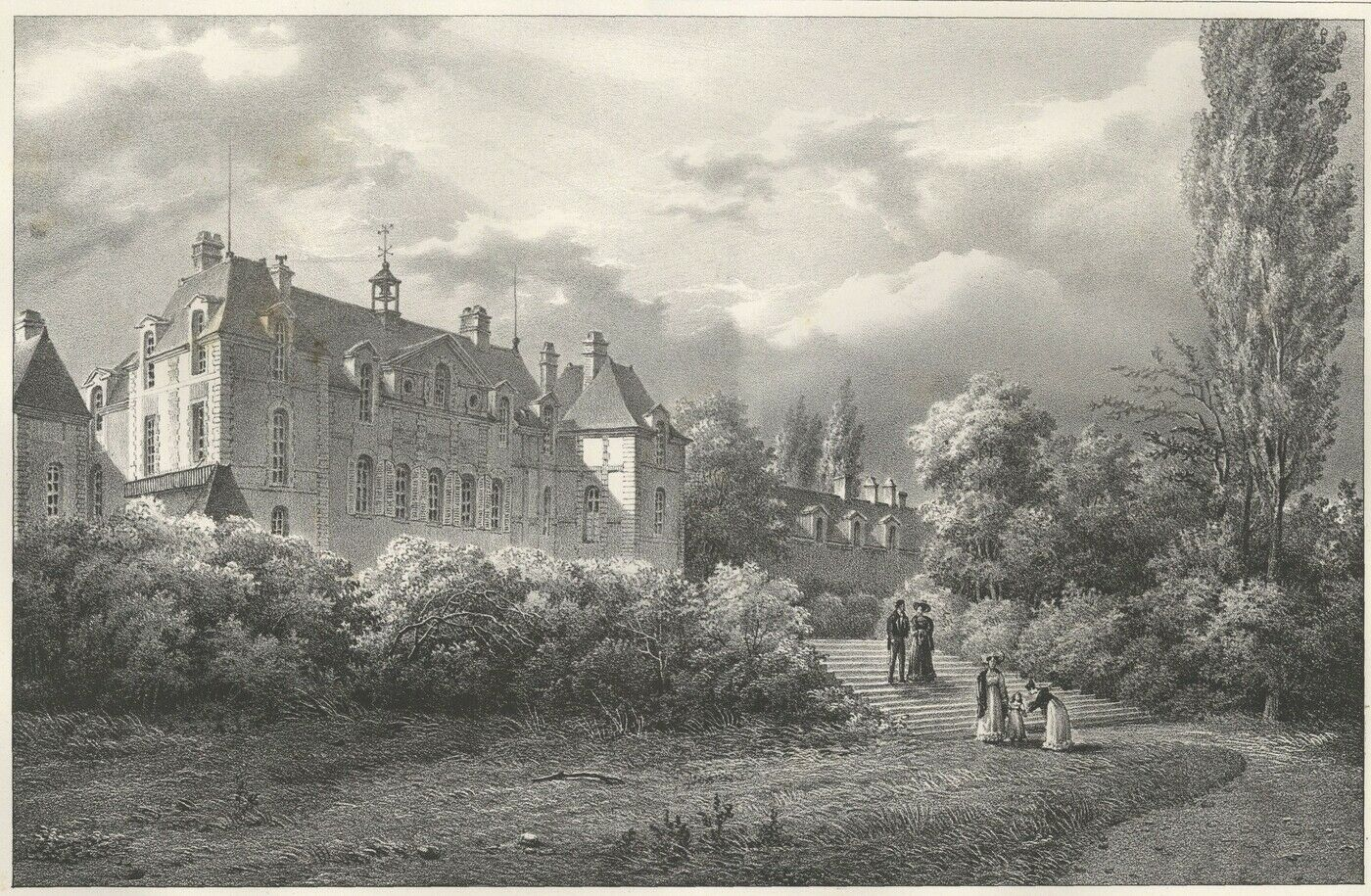
Château de Grosbois, lithograph by C. Motte from a drawing by Renoux

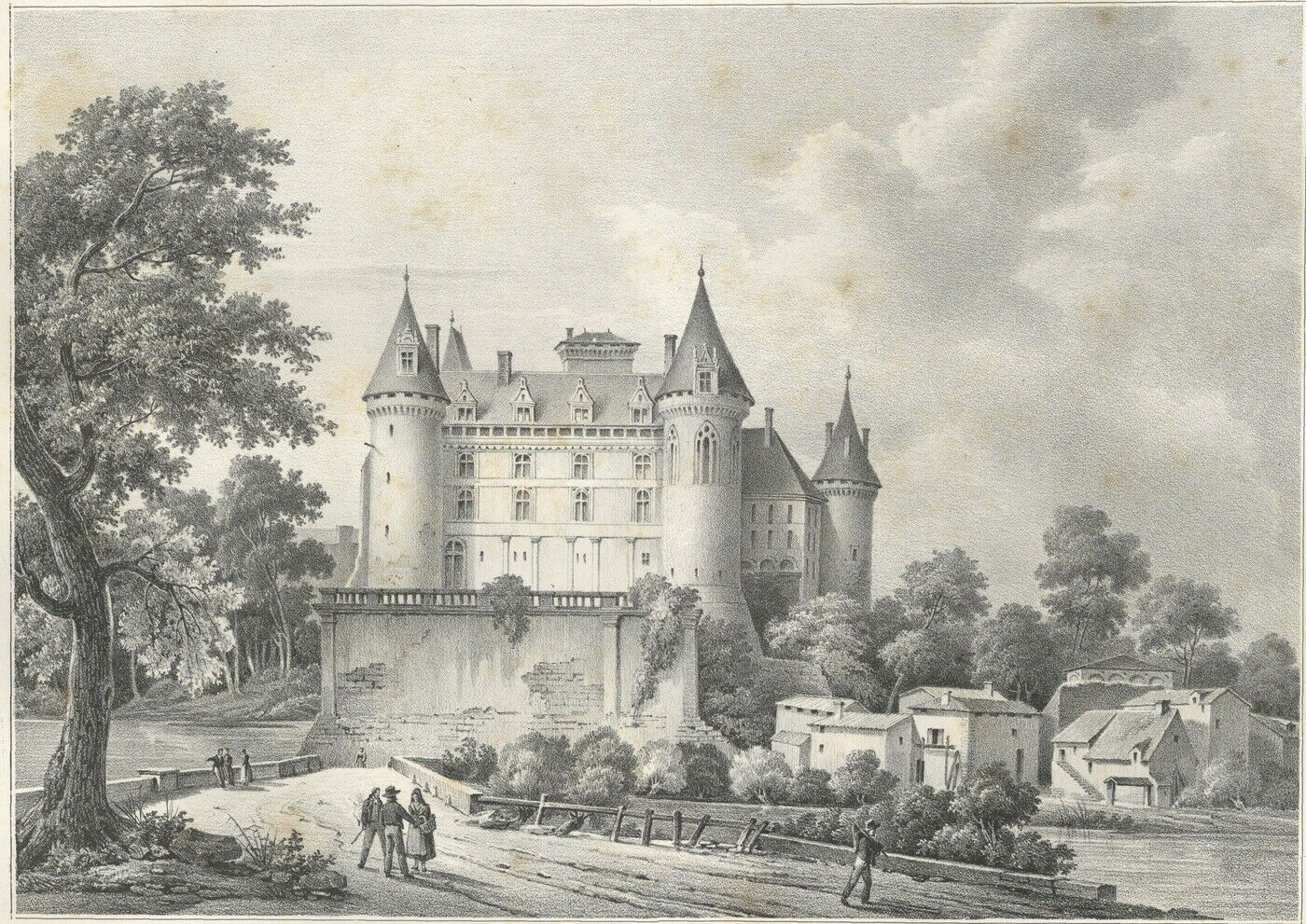
Chateau de la Rochefoucauld, lithograph by C. Motte from a drawing by Renoux

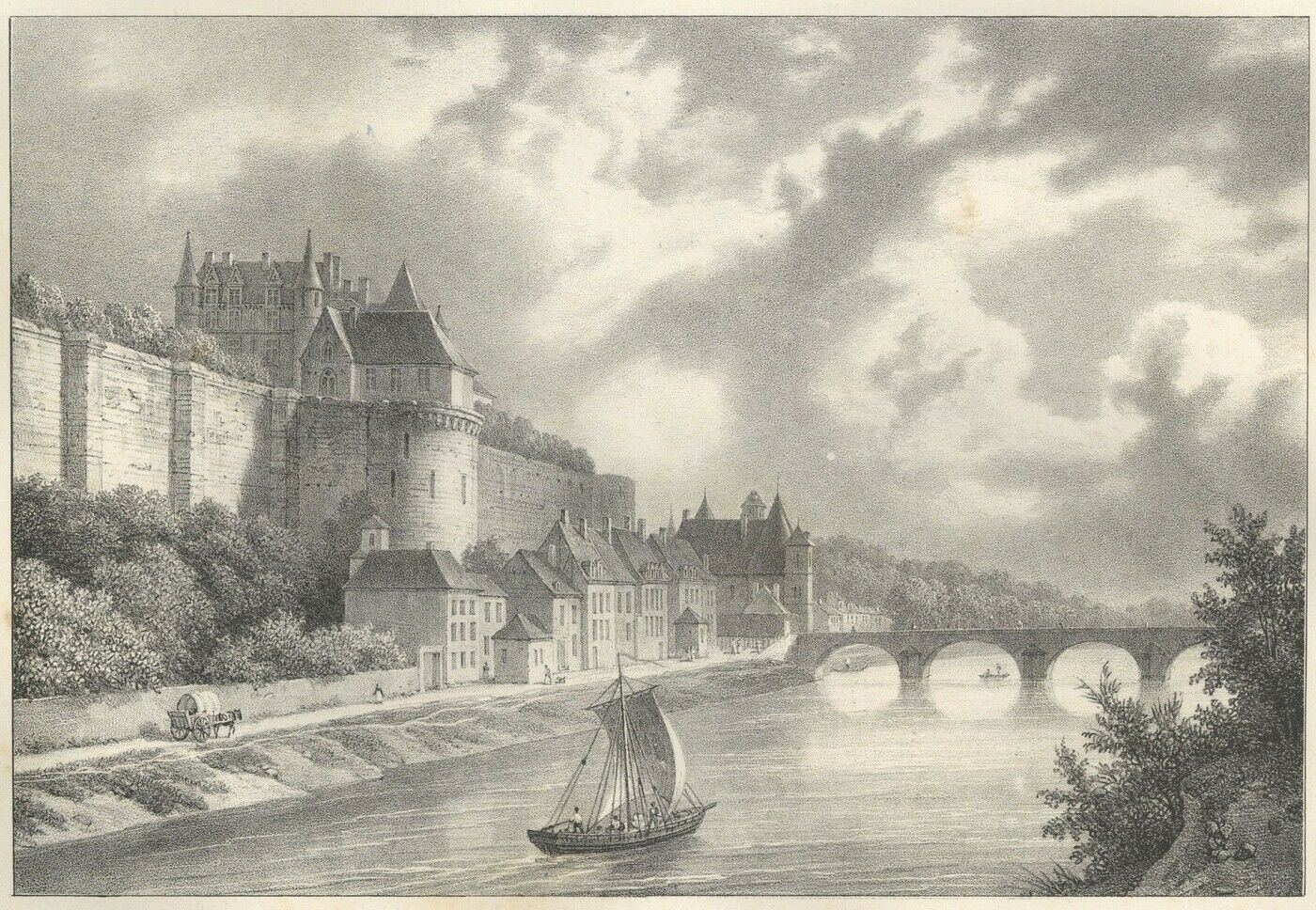
Chateau d'Amboise, lithograph by C. Motte from a drawing by Renoux

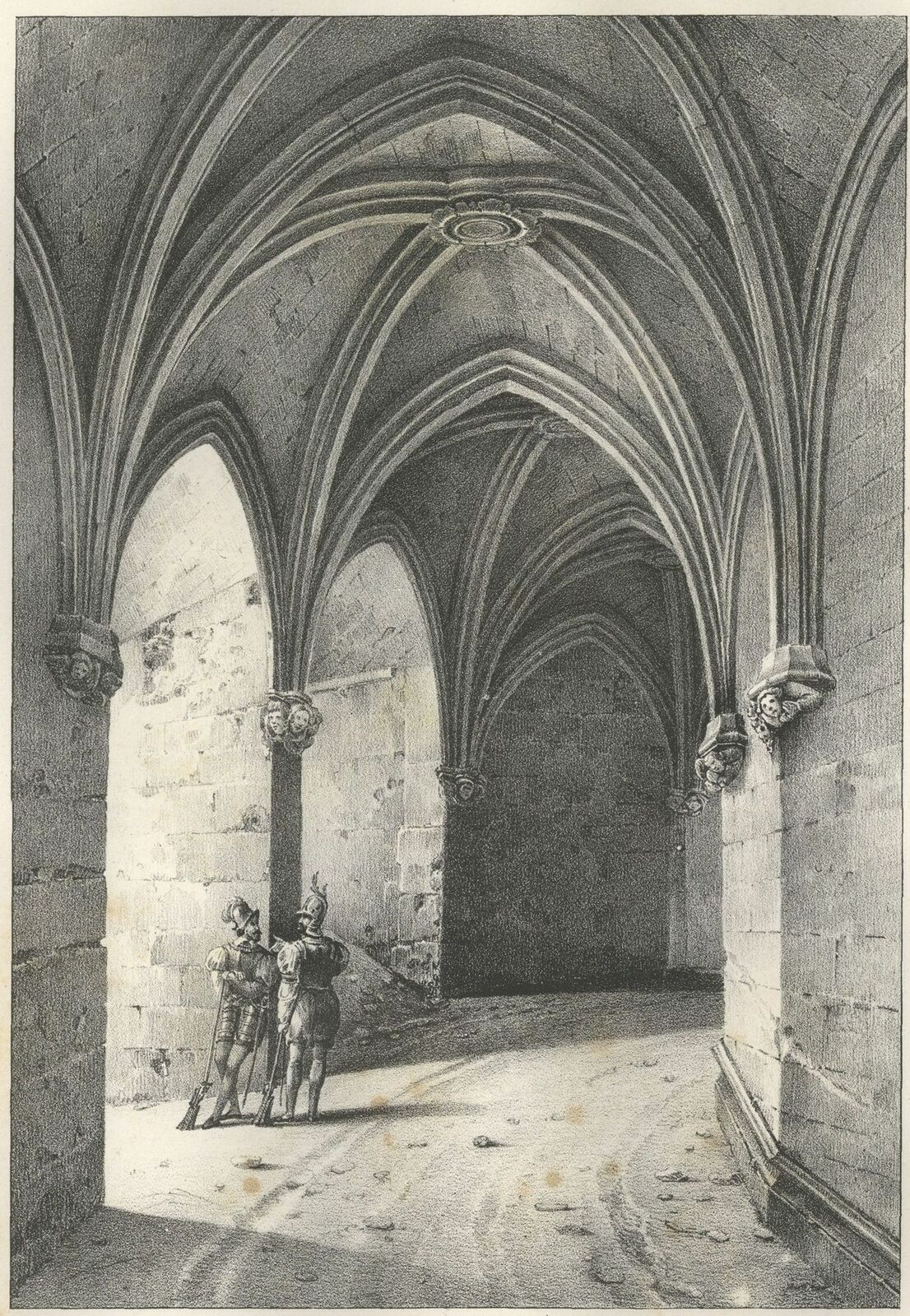
Interior of the Tower of the Chateau d'Amboise, lithograph by C. Motte from the drawing by Renoux

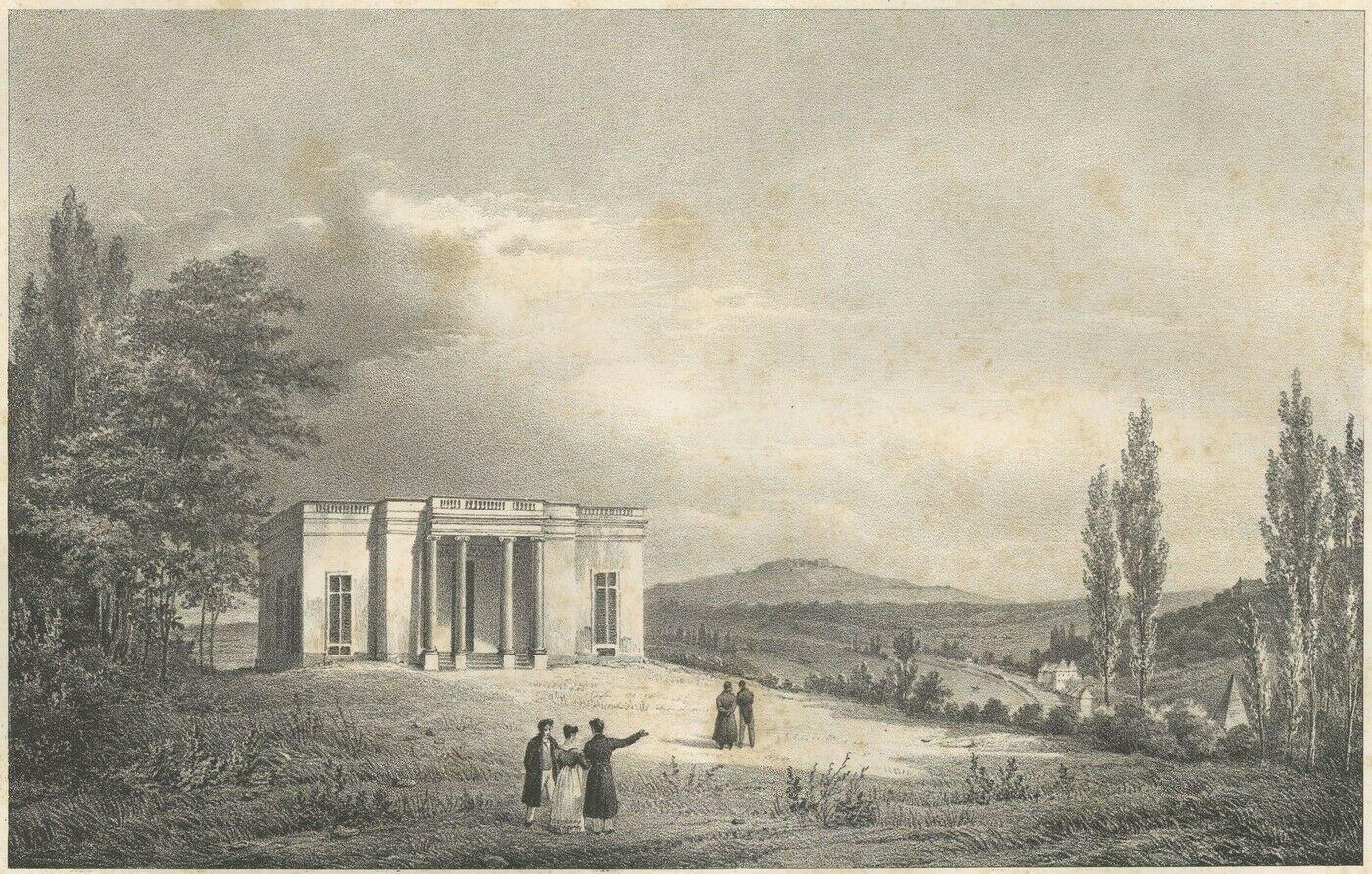
Pavillon de Lucienne, lithograph by C. Motte from the drawing by Renoux

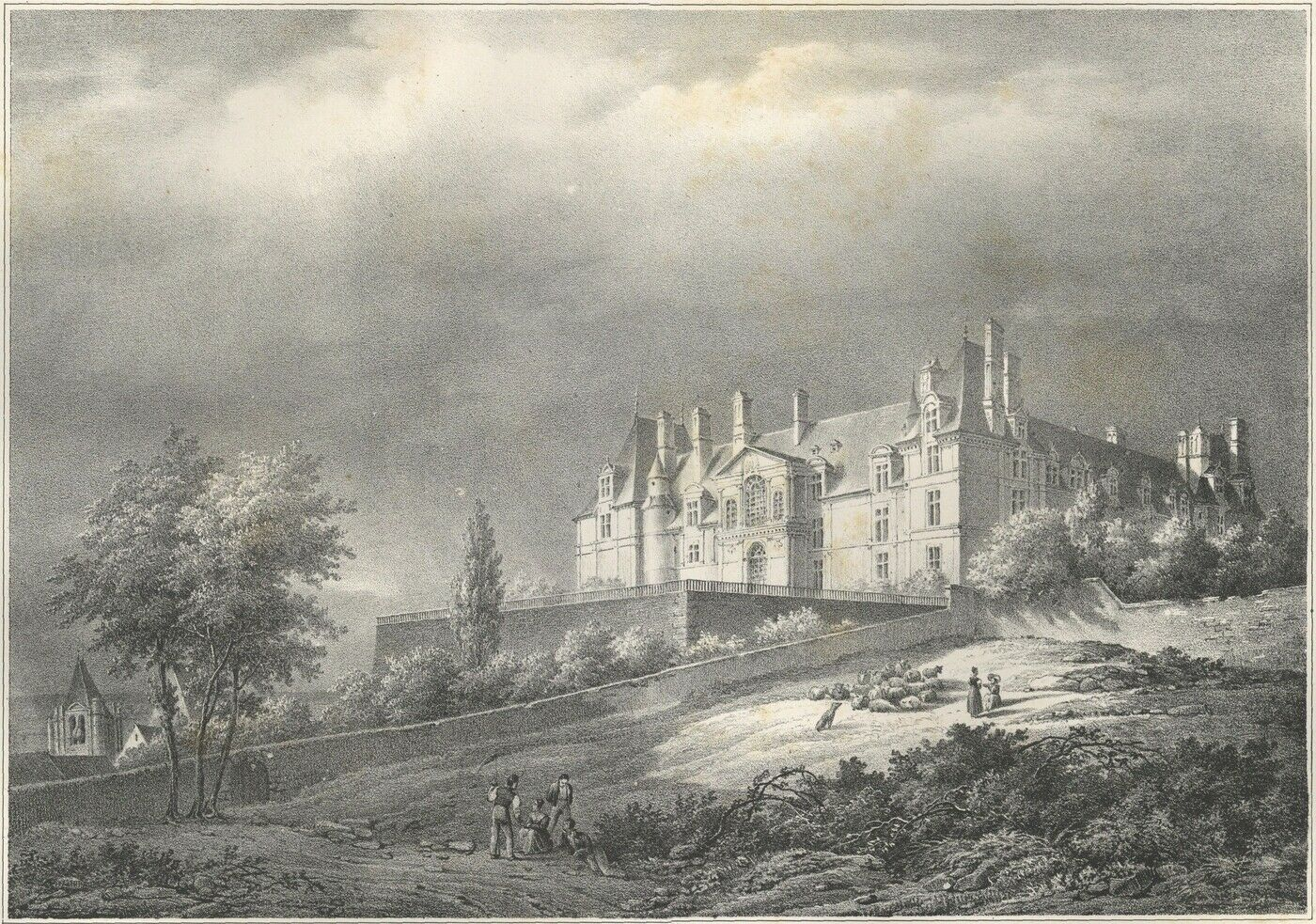
Chateau d'Ecouen, lithograph by C. Motte from the drawing by Renoux

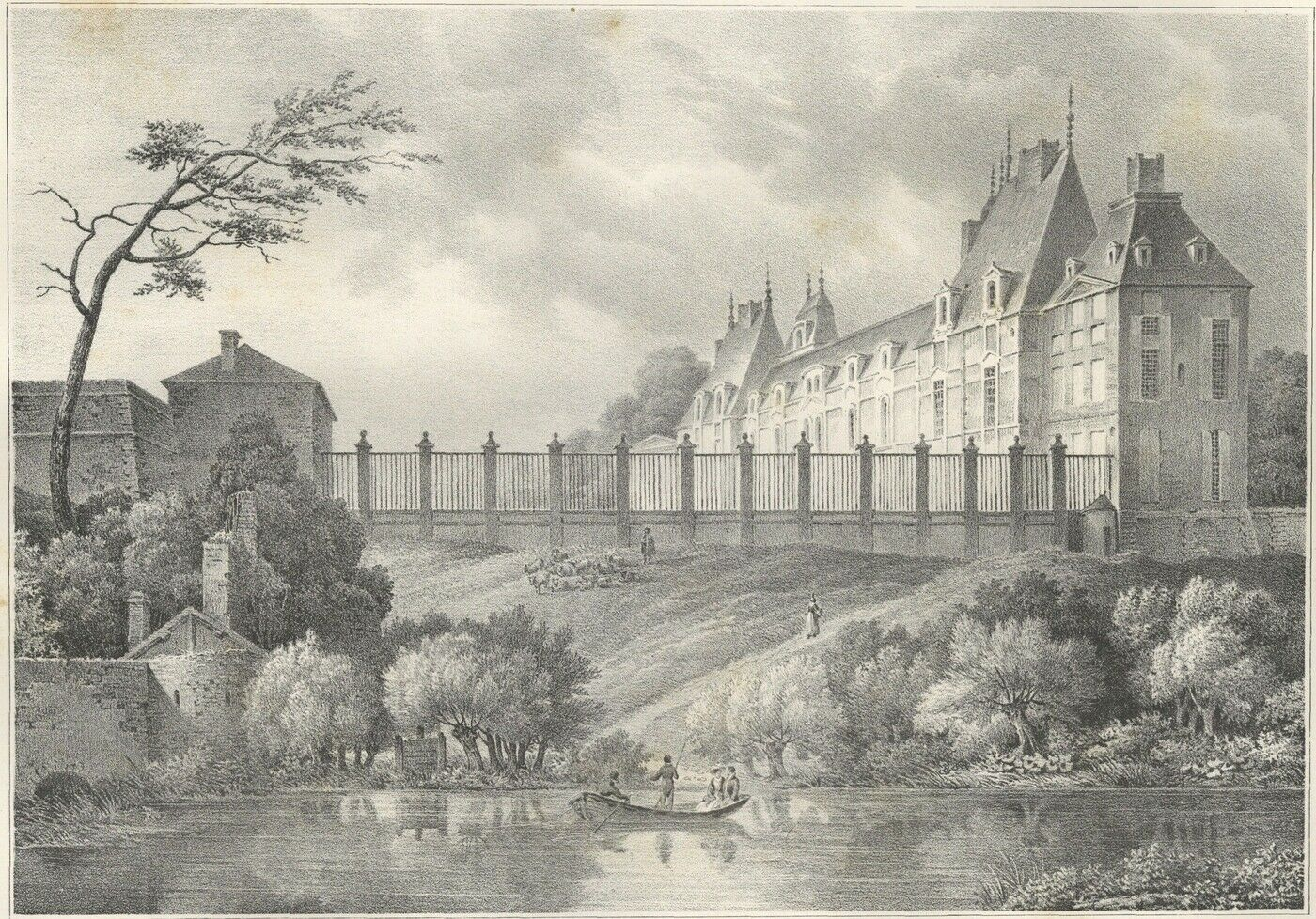
Chateau d'Eu, lithograph by C. Motte from the drawing by Renoux

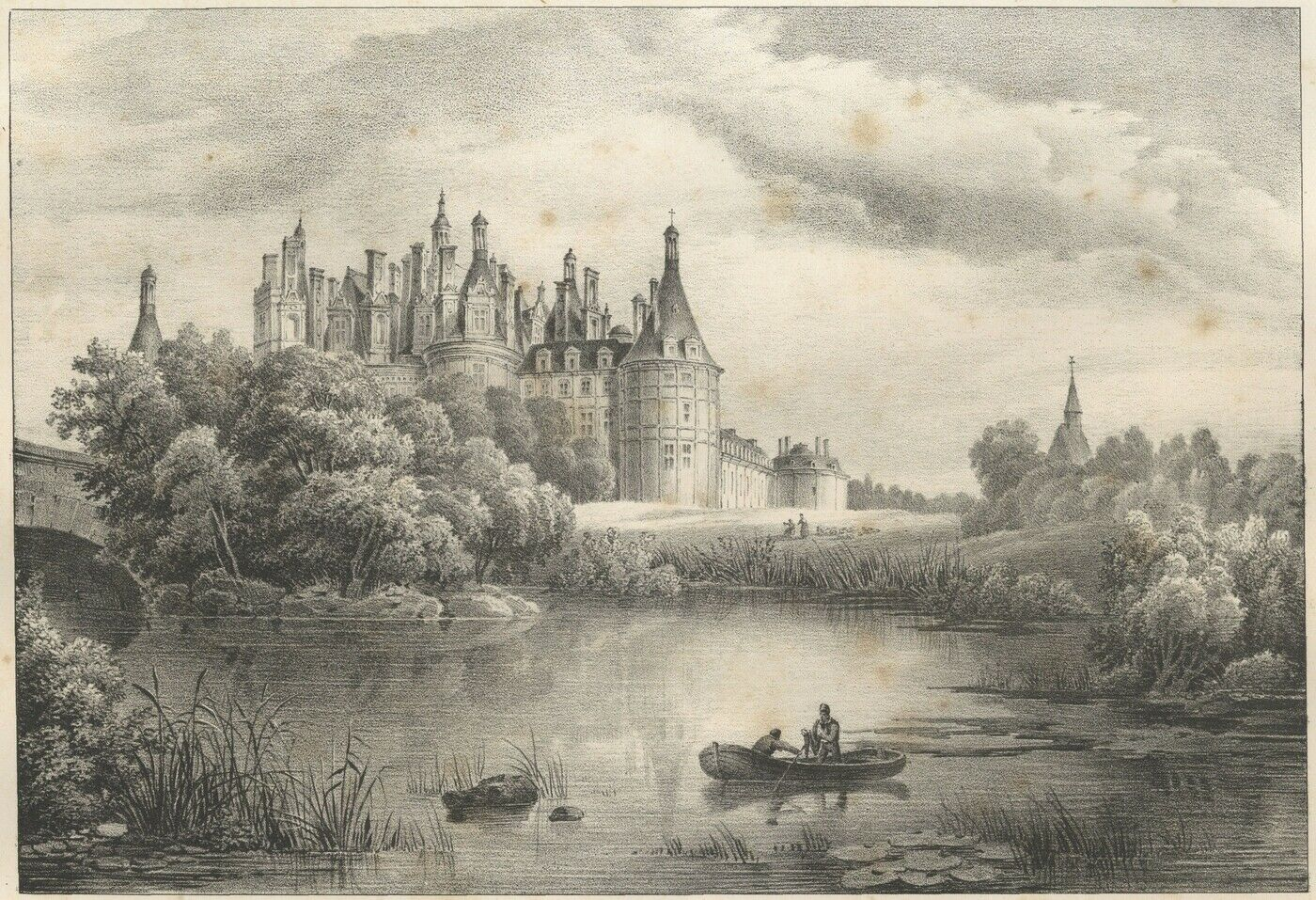
Chateau de Chambord, lithograph by C. Motte from the drawing by Renoux

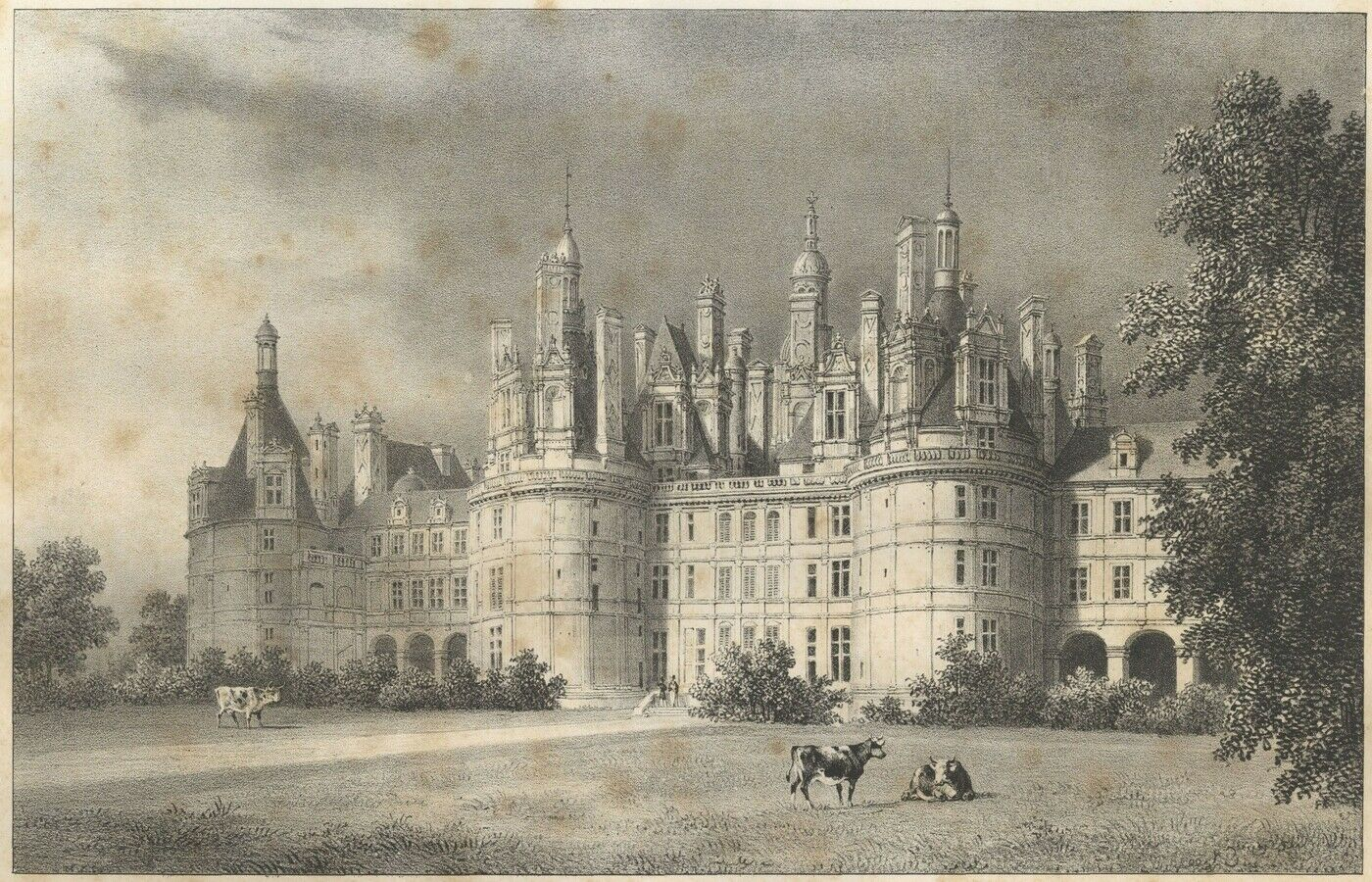
Chateau de Chambord, lithograph by C. Motte from the drawing by Renoux

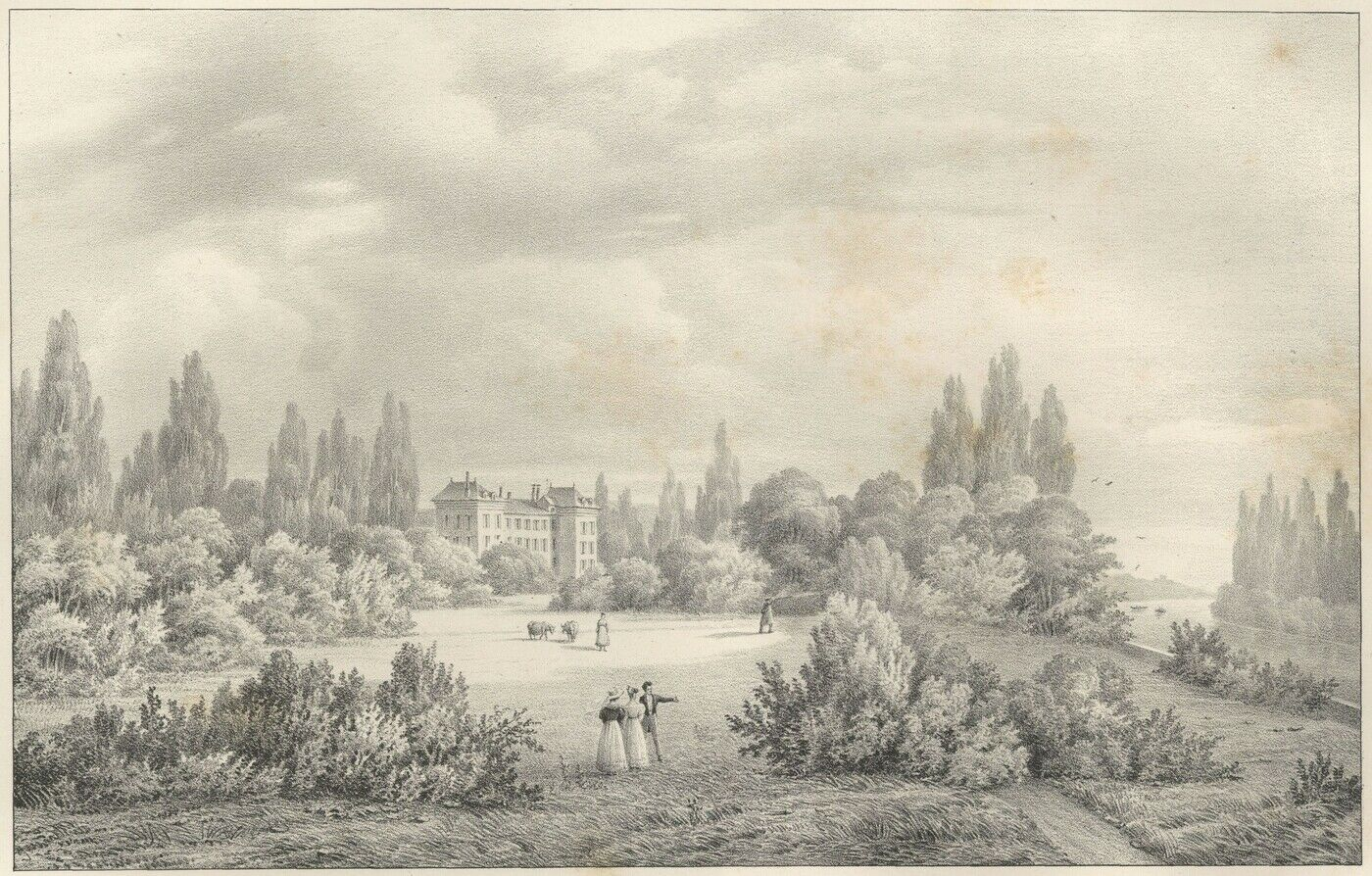
Chateau de Courbevoie, lithograph by C. Motte from the drawing by Renoux

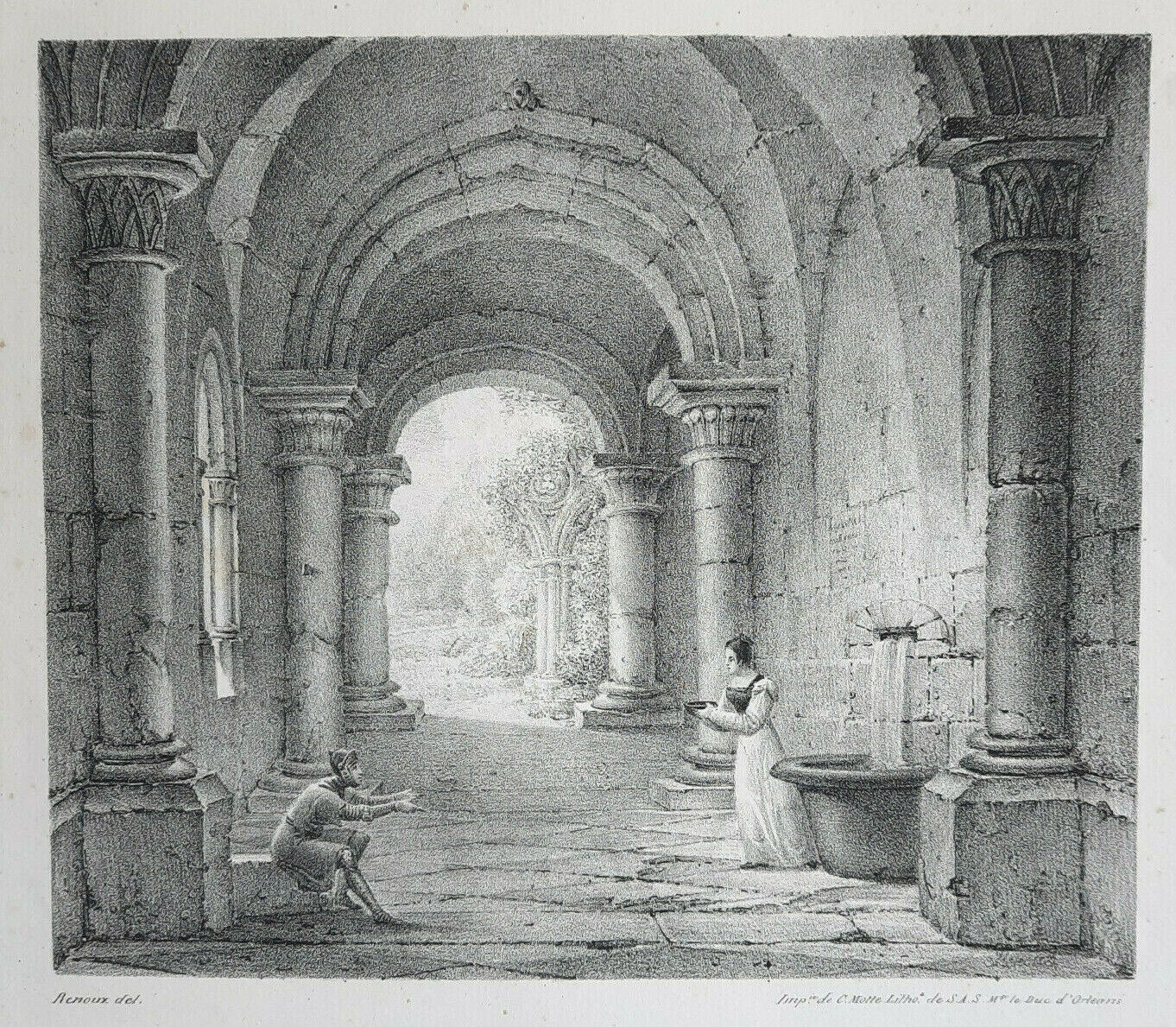
Maid offering water to a knight, lithograph by C. Motte from a drawing by Renoux

== Bibliography ==
- Bellier de La Chavignerie, Émile; Auvray, Louis. "Renoux (Charles Caïus)" entry in Dictionnaire général des artistes de l'École française depuis l'origine des arts du dessin jusqu'à nos jours: architectes, peintres, sculpteurs, graveurs et lithographes. Paris: 1882-1885, vol. II, p. 361-362.
- Fenêtres sur cour, catalogue of the exhibit at Musée des Augustins, Toulouse, Décembre 2016—Avril 2017, Lienart éditions, 2016. Renoux is mentioned and his painting Galerie d'un Cloître of 1841 is reproduced on pp. 16–17, in the essay "Le cloître: Réappropriation patrimoniale et représentations picturales, 1799-1831" by Marie-Claude Chaudonneret; two paintings by Renoux included in the exhibit (Le Cloître de Saint-Sever près de Rouen of 1835 and Intérieur de cloître of 1830) are reproduced, with notes by Axel Hémery, on pp. 84–87.
