= Prosper Marilhat =

French painter (1811–1847)

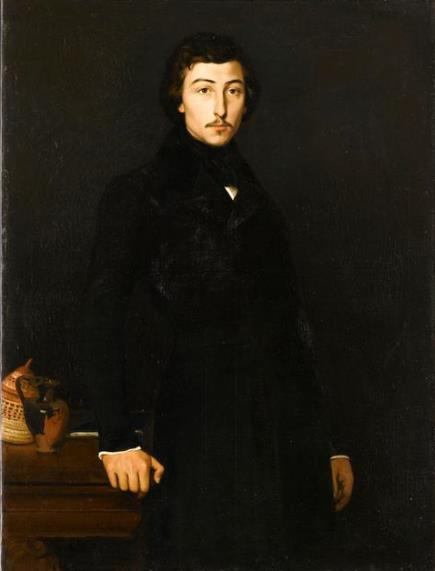
- Portrait of Prosper Marilhat by Théodore Chassériau, 1835
- Born: Antoine-George-Prosper Marilhat; 26 March 1811; Vertaizon, France
- Died: 13 September 1847 (aged 36); Paris, France
- Education: Camille Roqueplan
- Known for: Painter
- Movement: Orientalist

Antoine-George-Prosper Marilhat, usually known as Prosper Marilhat, (26 March 1811 – 13 September 1847) was a French Orientalist painter. Many of his most successful works were based on the sketches he drew during the time he spent in Lebanon, Syria, Palestine and Egypt in 1831–1832.

== Early life ==
He was born in Vertaizon. Encouraged by local artists, Marihat began painting at an early age. Although his parents wanted him to work in the cutlery business of Thiers, Puy-de-Dôme where he lived, the Baron de Barante convinced them he was more suited to an artistic career. He went to Paris in 1829 where he studied under Camille Roqueplan, exhibiting for the first time at the Paris Salon in 1831 with his Site d'Auvergne.

== Career ==
In May 1831, Marilhat was invited by Charles von Hügel to join him on a lengthy expedition but he only accompanied him as far as Alexandria. Over the following months, from October 1831 to May 1833, he completed ten albums of sketches there which would form the basis of his later paintings. In 1835, he travelled through Italy and spent 1836 in Provence. He exhibited in all the Paris Salons from 1837 to 1841 as well as at the Salon of 1844. While he specialized in architectural paintings and landscapes, he also painted portraits including one of his friend Théodore Chassériau which is now in the Louvre.

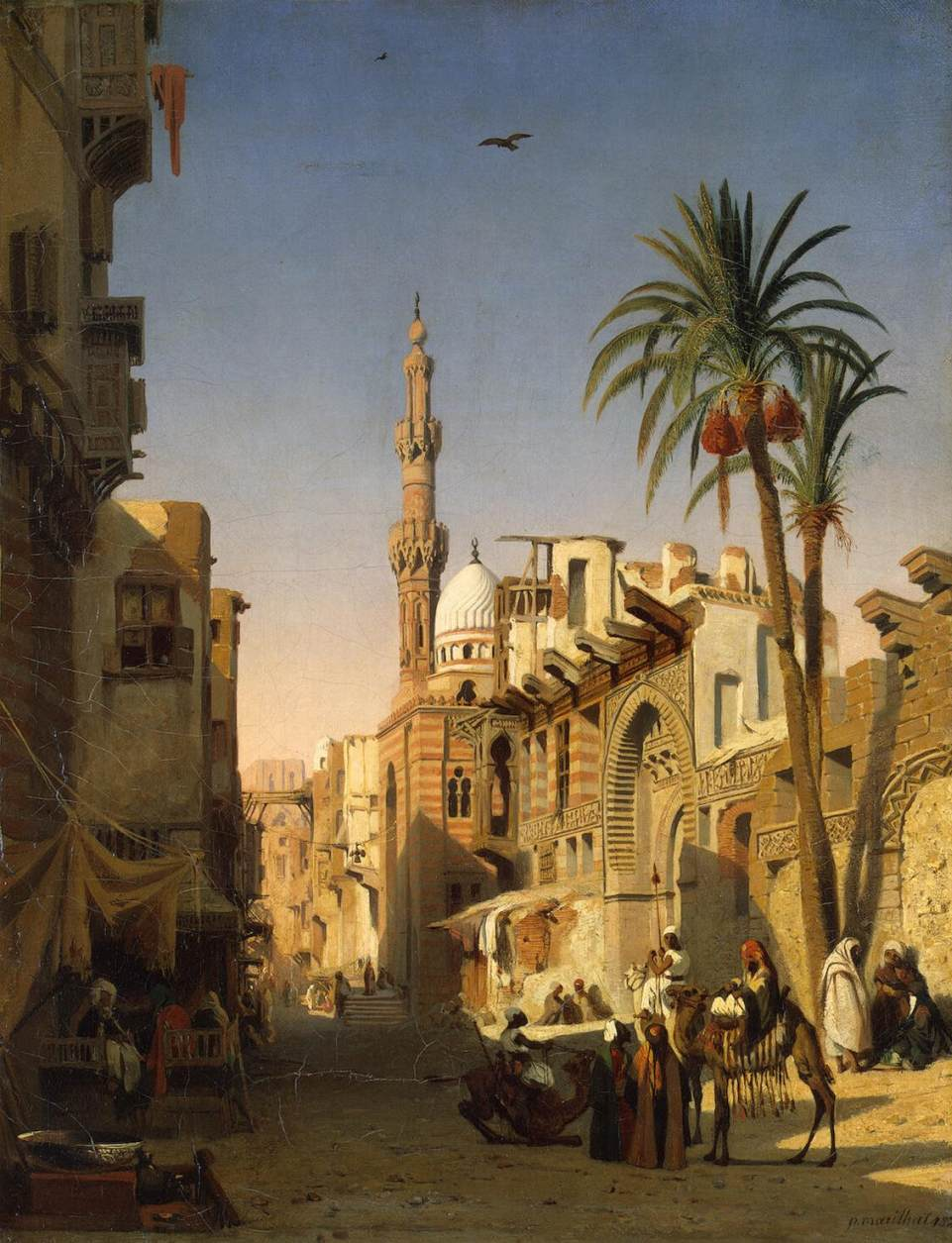
Prosper Marilhat: Une rue au Caire, Hermitage Musem

From 1840 to 1844, Marilhat painted a number of works inspired by his travels including Ruines de la mosquée El-Hakem au Caire, said to have captured the monumentality of the ruins and the romanticism of the location. Theophile Gautier was deeply moved by his Place de l’Esbekieh au Caire, remarking: "On seeing this painting, I became sick at heart, and yearned for the Orient, in which I had not yet set foot." At the Salon of 1844, his Souvenir des bords du Nil was praised, as was Arabes syriens en voyage, now in the Musée Condé, Chantilly.

Marilhat's work falls into three periods: his early traditional landscapes and portraits, the drawings and sketches during his travels to the Orient, and his paintings after 1838 which, in addition to his well-received oriental works also included mythological subjects. Suffering from syphilis, Prosper Marilhat became insane and died in a Paris asylum in September 1847, only 36 years old.

== A pioneer of Orientalism ==
Hired as an illustrator for Baron Karl von Hügel's scientific expedition, Marilhat travelled to the East in 1831 and 1832, visiting Greece, Syria, Lebanon, Palestine and Upper Egypt. This trip had a decisive influence on his work.

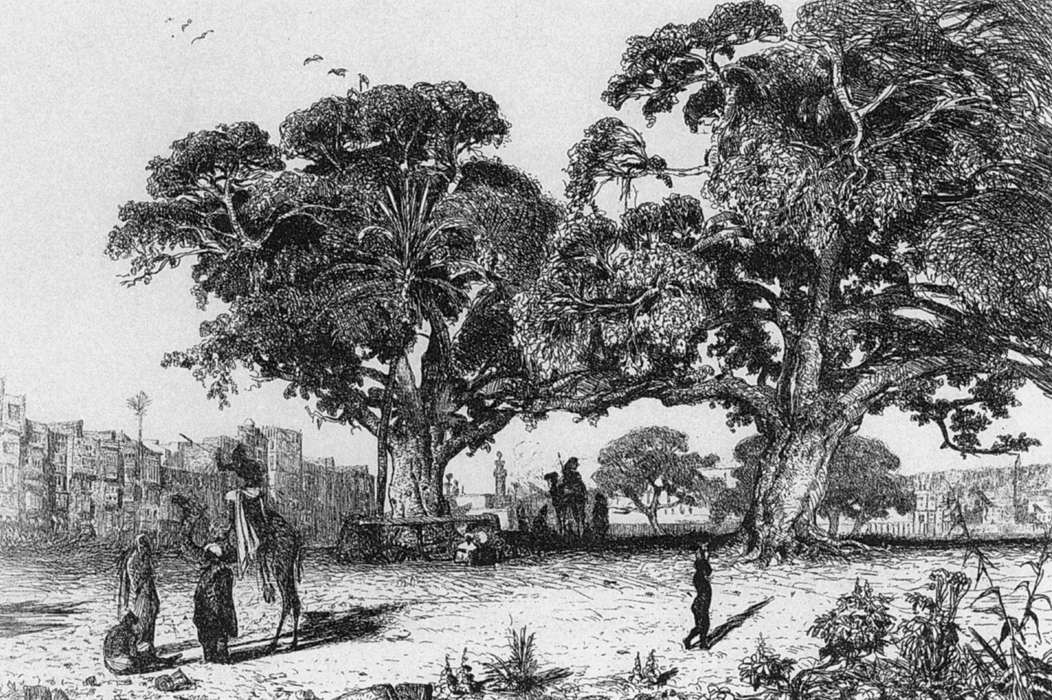
Marilhat, La place de l'Esbekieh au Caire, Salon of 1834

At the Salon of 1834, Marilhat exhibited the first works inspired by his trip to the East. His paintings caused a sensation and immediately established him as a major figure in Orientalism. Referring to Place de l'Esbekieh, the art critic Théophile Gautier wrote: "No painting has made a deeper and more lasting impression on me. I would be afraid of being accused of exaggeration if I said that the sight of this painting made me ill and inspired in me a nostalgia for the Orient, where I had never set foot. I believed that I had just recognised my true homeland, and when I turned my eyes away from the fiery painting, I felt exiled."

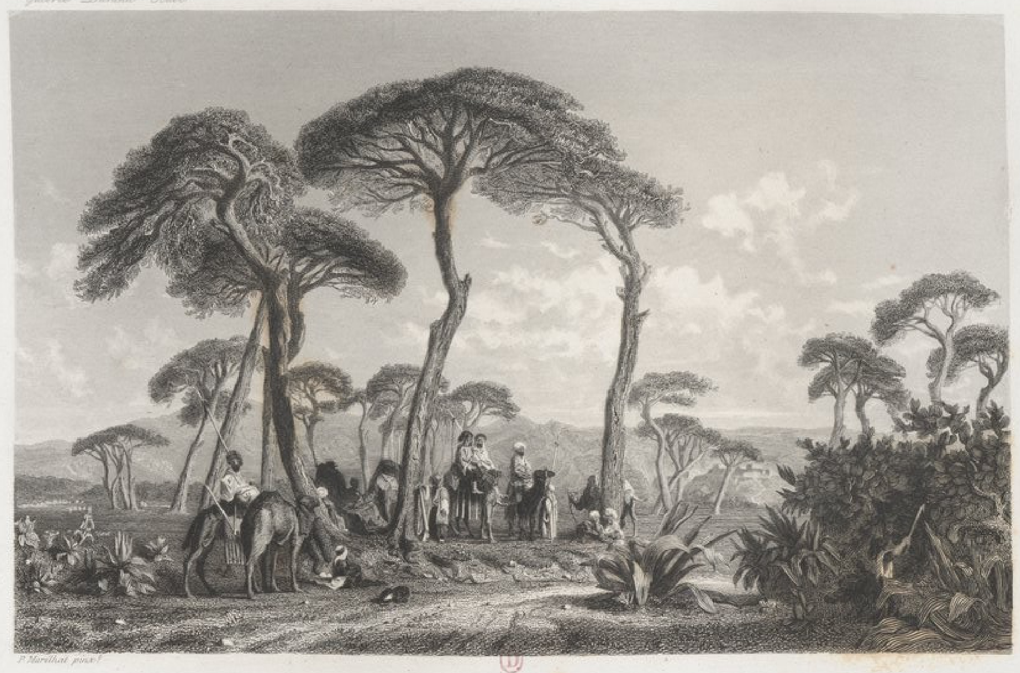
Marilhat, Souvenir des environs de Beyrouth, Salon of 1841

The Salon of 1841 marked Marilhat's consecration. Praising his painting Souvenir des Environs de Beyrouth, the newspaper Le constitutionnel wrote: ‘His view of the Beirut area heralds in his talent that decisive progress, that final step that is so difficult to take, which lifts a painter out of the ordinary and places him on the path of the great artists.’ Théophile Gautier enthusiastically hailed Marilhat as a revelator of the Orient: "This is indeed the painter of the Abu Mandour Mosque, the Esbekieh Square and so many other revelations of the Orient. Here we see firm lines, vibrant colours, the sun at its zenith, burning sand and pumice stone; tall exotic trees stretching boldly into the clear air..." The work was immediately acquired by the Cercle des Arts, a circle that brought together the intellectual and artistic elite, where Marilhat frequented Mérimée, Stendhal, Chopin, etc.

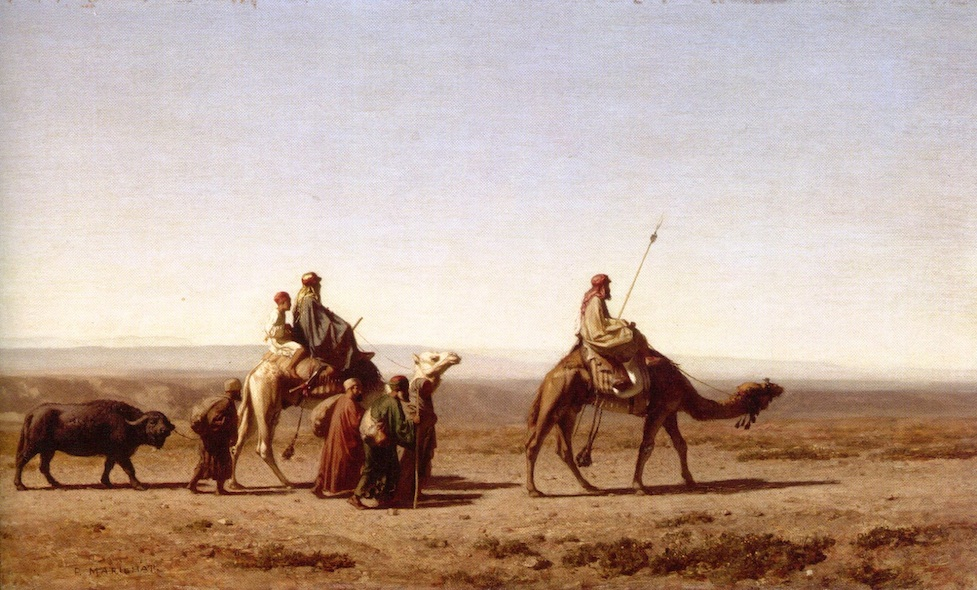
Marilhat, Arabes syriens en voyage, Salon of 1844n Musée Condé

Having missed the Salon in 1842 and 1843, Marilhat exhibited for the last time at the Salon of 1844. He presented six smaller-format Orientalist paintings: Syrian Arabs on a Journey, A Village near Rosetta, Memories of the Banks of the Nile. An Egyptian City at Dusk, Café on a Road in Syria, and View taken in Tripoli. In the Revue du Salon, Arsène Houssaye wrote: ‘Never have I travelled so well in the Orient, even with the poets. Twenty volumes of descriptions would not tell me as much.’ Théophile Gautier described Marilhat's paintings as “diamonds” and declared that the 1844 Salon was ‘Marilhat's swan song’.

Marilhat died at the age of thirty-six, having exhibited only twenty-two Orientalist paintings at the Salons between 1834 and 1844. Despite this small number, his work had a profound impact on his contemporaries, who recognised him as a pioneer of Orientalism, on a par with Alexandre Gabriel Decamps. On the occasion of the 1855 Universal Exhibition, the first international art exhibition, Maxime Du Camp wrote: ‘It can be said of [Decamps] and Marilhat that, in painting, they were the Christopher Columbus of the Orient.’

Prosper Marilhat's work influenced an entire generation of Orientalist painters, notably Eugène Fromentin and Léon Belly. As Arsène Houssaye recalls: "The exhibition of Marilhat's works was for Eugène Fromentin a vision on the road to Damascus". The writer and art critic Joris-Karl Huysmans, meanwhile, detects Marilhat's influence in Léon Belly's masterpiece, Pilgrims Going to Mecca, now kept at the Musée d'Orsay in Paris.

== The first faithful witness to Eastern landscapes ==
In his book Une année dans le Sahel (A Year in the Sahel), published in 1859, referring to Marilhat, Decamps and Delacroix, the painter Eugène Fromentin wrote: "For twenty years, three men have summed up almost everything that modern critics have called Oriental painting (...) One [Marilhat] painted Oriental landscapes, another [Decamps] painted landscapes and genre scenes, and the third [Delacroix] painted genre scenes and grand paintings (...) The landscape painter [Marilhat], by some strange twist of fate, was born to be a painter of the Orient."

A friend of the painter Camille Corot, with whom he travelled to Provence in 1835, Marilhat was above all a landscape painter. He stood out as such among Orientalist painters and produced the first faithful representations of Oriental landscapes.

From his trip to the East with Baron Von Hûgel, Marilhat brought back numerous landscape drawings. These drawings are not fantastical visions of the landscapes he travelled through, but rather are characterised by their scrupulous fidelity to what the painter saw. Art historian Bruno Foucart observes: ‘Among the Orientalists, Marilhat is one of the purest landscape painters (...) Perfectly composed, his works thrive on the fidelity of a description that is above all concerned with rendering the luminosity of the Orient.’

Eugène Fromentin emphasises Marilhat's concern for accuracy: "The landscape artist began by visiting the most famous places on earth and describing them, signing them with the name of a town, village or mosque: treating them almost like portraits, he had to name the original. His work is the exquisite and perfect illustration of a journey for which he could have written the text himself, for he brought to his writing the same accuracy of vision and the same liveliness of style and expression as he did to his painting."

Marilhat's works are the first faithful representations of the landscapes he travelled through and are therefore valuable historical records. For example, Place de l'Esbekieh in Cairo (Salon of 1834) preserves the memory of the place before its Westernisation, just as Souvenir des Environs de Beyrouth (Salon of 1841) recalls what the Bois des Pins in Beirut was like before its urbanisation.

=== Marilhat, a portraitist of plants and trees ===
It was as the artist accompanying the scientific expedition of an Austrian aristocrat and botanist, Baron Karl von Hügel, that Marilhat set out on his journey to the East in 1831: Syria, Lebanon, Palestine, and then, in early 1832, Upper Egypt.

During his journey, Marilhat developed a passion for the vegetation of the East, which he rendered with great attention to detail in his numerous sketches made from life: palm trees, carob trees, prickly pears, Lebanese cedars, Aleppo pines, etc.

Marilhat is renowned for his depictions of vegetation. Danièle Menu, author of an essay for a catalogue raisonné, notes: “Lamartine admired Marilhat’s pines; Théophile Gautier, the giant baobab at Esbekieh Square in Cairo”.

In her commentary on the 1839 Salon, Georges Sand remarked: “I had noticed with great pleasure the landscapes of Mr Marilhat. I found in him a very rare quality, namely that he knew how to paint a portrait of a tree, and in his compositions I saw nothing conventional, nothing that did not bear the mark of truth.”

== Works ==
- Site d'Auvergne (1831)
- La place de l'Esbekieh (1834)
- Intérieur d'un village, environs de Thiers (1835)
- Souvenir de la Campagne de Rosette (Gold Medal, 1835)
- Scène pastorale (1837)
- Pont du Gard (1838)
- Nymphes dans une clairière (1839)
- Les Jardins d'Armide (1839)
- Le delta (1839)
- Ruines d'une ancienne mosquée dans la ville des Tombeaux au Caire (1840)
- Une caravane arrêtée dans les ruines de Balbek (1840)
- Souvenirs des environs de Beyrouth (1841)
- Ruines grecques (1841)
- Vue de la Place de l'Esbekieh au Caire (1844)
- Café à Boulak (1844)
- La Mosquée Babel-Wase (1844)
- Tombeaux arabes à Salmiè (1844)
- Village près de Rosette (1844)
- Souvenir des bords du Nil (1844)
- Arabes syriens en voyage (1844)
- Souvenirs des environs de Thiers (1844)
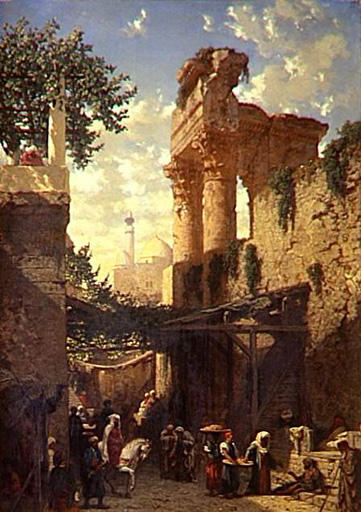
Une rue au Caire, Musée Condé, Chantilly

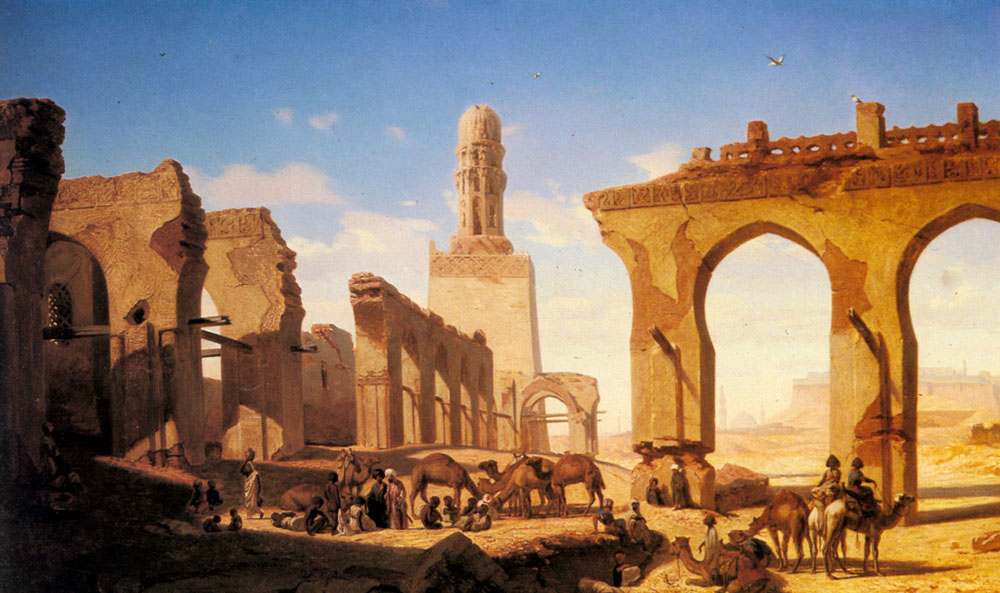
Ruines de la Mosquée du Calife Haken au Caire, Louvre Museum, Paris

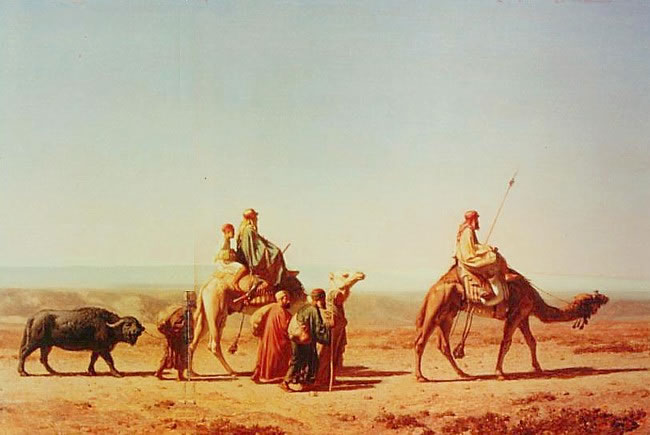
Arabes syriens en voyage, Musée Condé, Chantilly

== See also ==
- List of Orientalist artists
- Orientalism

== Sources and further reading ==
- Roger Bonniot, Le peintre auvergnat Prosper Marilhat; étude iconographiques, in Revue "L'Auvergne Littéraire" pp. 3–28, No 191, 4th quarter 1966.
- Édouard Charton, Marilhat, paysagiste. Fragments de ses lettres inédites, in "Le Magasin Pittoresque", 1856, pp. 347–350, 370–371, 403–404.
- A. Delafoulhouze, « Notice sur Prosper Marilhat, peintre de paysage », in "Bulletin Historique et Scientifique de l’Auvergne", 1862, tome IV, pp. 27–49.
- Hippolyte Gomot, Marilhat et son œuvre, Impr. Mont-Louis, Clermont-Ferrand, 1884, 101p. Online text from Gallica.
- Marie-Laure Hallopeau, Prosper Marilhat : Peintures, Dessins, Gravures, Catalogue de l'exposition au Musée Bargoin, juin - Septembre 1973, 32p., ill., La Source d'Or & Le Centre de Recherches Révolutionnaires et Romantiques, 1973.
- Danièle Menu, Prosper Marilhat (1811-1847). Essai de Catalogue, Mémoire de maîtrise, Faculté des Lettres de Dijon, manuscrit, 1972 (près de 250 œuvres recensées).
- Serge Trouillet, Prosper Marilhat, Peintre de la ligne et du soleil, in Revue "Un, Deux... Quatre", pp. 1–19, ill., No 156, 07/01/1998 au 20/01/1998.
