= Odinel de Umfraville =

English aristocrat; son of Robert I de Umfraville

- Reign: 1145–1166
- Predecessor: Robert I de Umfraville
- Successor: Odinel de Umfraville
- Died: 1166
- Father: Robert I de Umfraville

Odinel de Umfraville (d. 1166) was an English aristocrat, son of Robert I de Umfraville. He owned lands in Northumberland (with Prado Castle) and Yorkshire. He received land from the English King Henry II Plantagenet, in which he began the construction of Harbottle Castle around 1160.

== Origin ==
It is not documented when representatives of the genus appeared in England. Currently, it is considered most likely that the Umfrawili originate from the Norman settlement of Ofranville, located near Dieppe. The first reliably known representative of the genus was Robert I de Umfraville, who received possessions in Northumberland and Yorkshire from King Henry I of England. The main residence of the Umfraville was the Prado Castle, located south of the River Tyne, which allowed control of the road from Carlisle to Newcastle. In addition, it is likely that it was Robert I de Umfraville who received in Scotland possessions in Kinnaird and Danipas (Stirlingshire), which were later disposed of by his descendants.

Robert from his marriage with an unknown left two sons: One Barely I and probably Gilbert I.

== Biography ==
Odinel, around 1145, inherited his father's possessions in Northumberland, centered in the Prado. Although he was a vassal of the English king, he also retained ties with Scotland: His name appears several times as a witness on the charters of the Scottish kings David I and Malcolm IV, as well as the future Scottish King William I the Lion (who was Earl of Northumberland during this period) and Bishop Robert of St. Andrews.

In 1156, Odinel participated in a lawsuit against William de Vesky. And shortly before 1162, in Welton, a Judge passed judgment concerning lands in Barradon and Willrinton.

In 1158, Odinel accompanied the English King Henry II Plantagenet to Cumberland.

Around 1157, Henry II, who sought to secure Northumberland from the Scots, granted Odinel land on the condition that he would build a castle there. The construction of a wooden castle of the motte and bailey type, named Harbottle, began around 1160

Odinel was last mentioned in 1166 as the owner of two knightly fiefs in Yorkshire. He was succeeded by his son, Odinel II.

== Marriage and babies ==
The name of Odinel's wife is unknown. Son - Odinel II de Umfraville (died 1182), feudal Baron of Prado

== Bibliography ==
- Balfour P. The Scots Peerage. — Edinburgh: David Douglas, 1904. — Vol. I.
- Summerson H. Umfraville, de, family (per. c. 1100–1245) // Oxford Dictionary of National Biography. — Oxf.: Oxford University Press, 2004—2014.
- Sanders I. J. English Baronies: A Study of their Origin and Descent 1086—1327. — Oxford: Clarendon Press, 1960. — 203 p.
- The Complete Peerage of England, Scotland, Ireland, Great Britain and the United Kingdom / G. E. Cokayne, revised and edited by the Hon. Vicary Gibbs. — 2nd edition revised. — London: The St. Catherine Press, 1910. — Vol. I. Ab-Adam to Basing.
