= Florine Langweil =

French art collector, entrepreneur (1861–1958

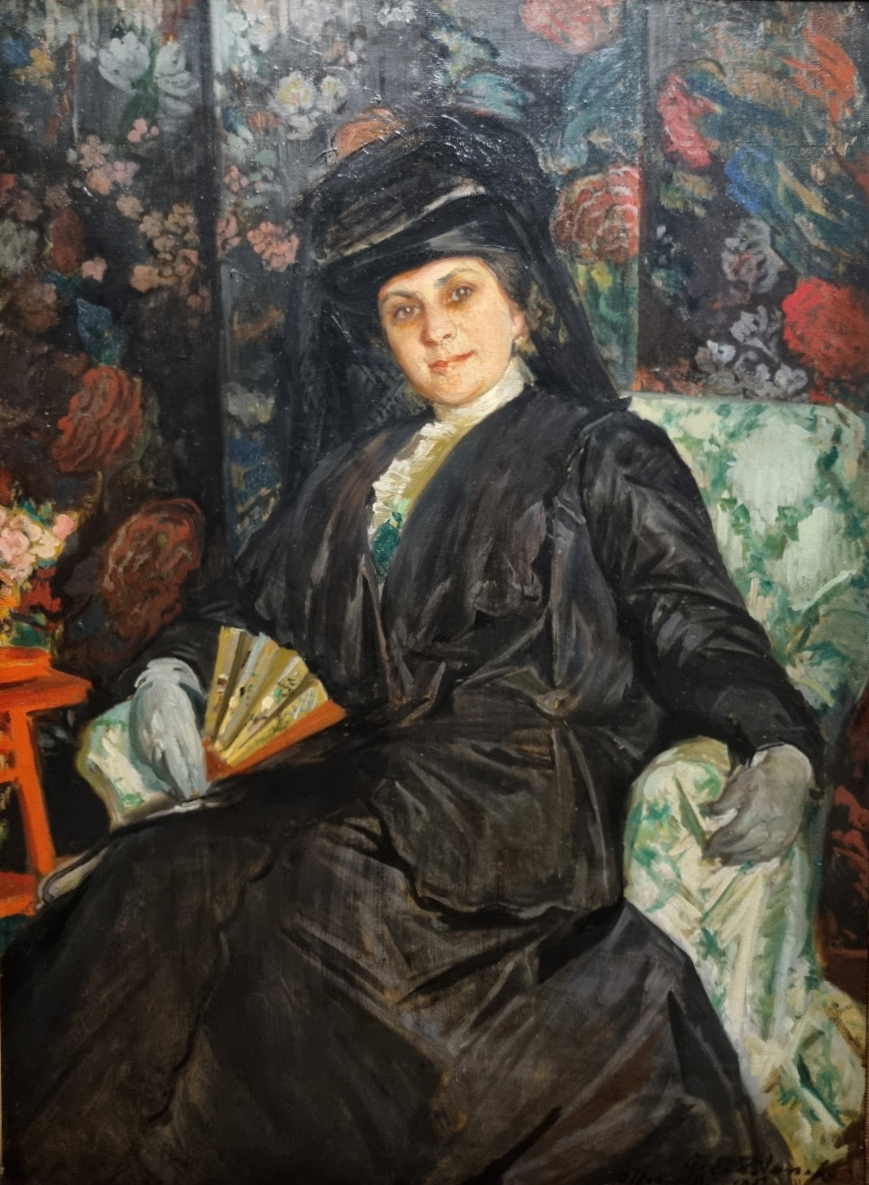
- Portrait of Madame Langweil by Jacques-Émile Blanche
- Born: Florine Ebstein; 10 September 1861; Wintzenheim, France
- Died: 28 December 1958 (aged 97); Paris, France
- Occupations: Art collector and dealer

Florine Langweil, née Ebstein (1861–1958), was a French art patron, collector, dealer and specialist in Far Eastern works in pre-World War II Paris. She rose from poverty to exceptional wealth based on her business transactions in Asian art.

== Biography ==
Florine Ebstein was born 10 September 1861 into a poor Jewish family of innkeepers, Isaac Ebstein and Barbe Blum, in Wintzenheim, near Colmar in Alsace, France. After her parents died in 1881, she moved to Paris and lived with a cousin who ran an Alsatian specialty shop. There, she met her future husband, Charles Langweil, who was 25 years her senior and a wealthy antiques dealer from Bohemia. She married him in 1885, and they had two daughters, Berthe (born 1886) and Lucie ("Lily") (born 1887). After eight years of marriage, Charles Langweil abandoned his family, and his debts, for London in 1893 and Florine took over his shop on the Boulevard des Italiens.

At first she seemed ill-prepared to take on the job, but according to Emery, she rose from a "barely literate young woman into a millionaire merchant who hired a secretary."

At that time, Japonism was peaking in popularity, so she changed the inventory of her struggling antique shop to include works originating in China and Japan. She also acquired more imported objects from the Far East. The renewed store became a sensation, and her success was considerable. Famous personalities became her clients. It was there that she met the artist Henri Rivière who would become a good friend.

After 10 years, in 1903, she could afford to buy and open a new shop at a large aristocratic house at 26, place Saint-Georges, a prestigious address. The art critic Arsène Alexandre described it as "both the museum and the warehouse of everything most rare, venerable, and dazzling that Japanese and Chinese art have produced." Inspector General of French Museums, wrote about the opening: It doesn't seem like a shop at all, but like a house from One Thousand and One Nights, with a magical and worldly hostess. Langweil was also valued as an expert on Far Eastern art and published her expertise in several publications.

By 1913, just ten years later, Langweil had become a very wealthy woman and decided to retire from the business. The art critic Alexandre ran the announcement with the headline on the front page of the newspaper Le Figaro: End of an Art Dream. Langweil bought a former hotel to house her art collection and lived there until the end of her life (interrupted only by the Second World War).

=== World War I ===
Langweil remained fond of her old homeland and maintained contact with her brothers who had remained in Alsace. In 1914, she donated four crates of Far Eastern art to the Unterlinden Museum in Colmar. However, the First World War prevented further donations to Colmar. She founded a relief organization for evacuees and took in wounded soldiers for convalescence at her home, creating 28 beds. In 1916, she organized an exhibition to raise funds, in which Parisian artists were to explore Far Eastern art. A notable feature was one room entirely decorated with floral motifs by Jacques-Émile Blanche.

After the war, in 1920, she bequeathed one work each by Jacques-Émile Blanche, Henri Rivière, Léon Belly and Ary Scheffer to the Colmar Museum. For her dedication, she was made a Knight of the Legion of Honor in 1921. Because she had made such generous donations to the Unterlinden Museum, a "Langweil Room" was established there in 1923. Then, in 1929, the ever-growing collection was cataloged by Jean-Jacques Waltz.

In 1923, Langweil, together with Jean-Jacques Waltz, established the Prix de Français en Alsace for primary schools that promoted the French language. More than 1,700 Alsatian schools applied for the award, which was given out until the outbreak of war. In 1935, Langweil was promoted to Officer of the Legion of Honour.

=== World War II ===
When the Second World War began in France, Langweil fled Paris for Toulouse in the south of France along with her daughter and son-in-law, André Noufflard. She subsequently bought a country estate in the Dordogne, where Henry Rivière also spent the war years. There, she had to use falsified identity papers to conceal her Jewish identity from the Nazi occupying forces. Meanwhile, a large part of the collection she had stored in Paris was stolen by German occupiers. In 1949, after the war, many of the stolen items were returned to her by the French Artistic Recovery Commission.

Florine Langweil died in Paris on 28 December 1958, at the age of 97. With the exception of a few art items that went to the Unterlinden Museum, Langweil's estate was auctioned at the Hôtel Drouot auction house in Paris in June 1959.

== Legacy ==
- Named a Knight of the Legion of Honor in 1921
- The "Langweil Room" was established in July 1923 at Unterlinden Museum in Colmar
- Named an Officer of the Legion of Honour in 1935.
- The Langweil Collection is exhibited from time to time, most recently in 2014, at the Unterlinden in Colmar.
- A street in Wintzenheim is named after her.
