= Narcisse Berchère =

French painter and engraver (1819–1891)

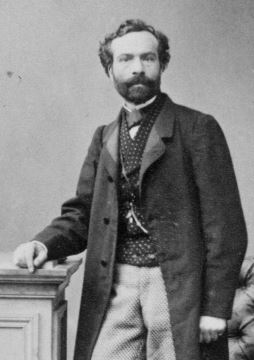
Narcisse Berchère (1860s)

Narcisse Berchère (11 September 1819 – 20 September 1891) was a French painter and engraver best known for his Orientalist works.

== Biography ==
He was born in Étampes. His initial studies were at the École des Beaux-Arts de Paris, with Charles-Caïus Renoux. Later, he worked in the studios of Jean-Charles-Joseph Rémond.

He spent much of his working life in Paris; making extended trips to Provence and Spain, and specializing in landscapes. He visited Egypt, Asia Minor and the Greek archipelago from 1849 to 1850 and sent his first paintings to the Salon from Greece.

In 1856, he returned to Egypt and crossed the Sinai desert with his friend, the painter Léon Belly. They were then joined by Jean-Léon Gérôme and Auguste Bartholdi; setting out on an expedition up the Nile Valley that October.

Four years later, Ferdinand de Lesseps entrusted him to create a series of paintings, tracing the different stages in the excavation of the Suez Canal. During this project he maintained a detailed correspondence with Eugène Fromentin. Their letters were published in 1863. He was invited to attend the inaugural ceremonies at the Canal in 1869.

After many years of travelling throughout North Africa and the Middle East, he settled in Asnières-sur-Seine, where he died in 1891. Many of his sketches and paintings are preserved at the Musée municipal d'Étampes, in Essonne.

== Selected paintings ==
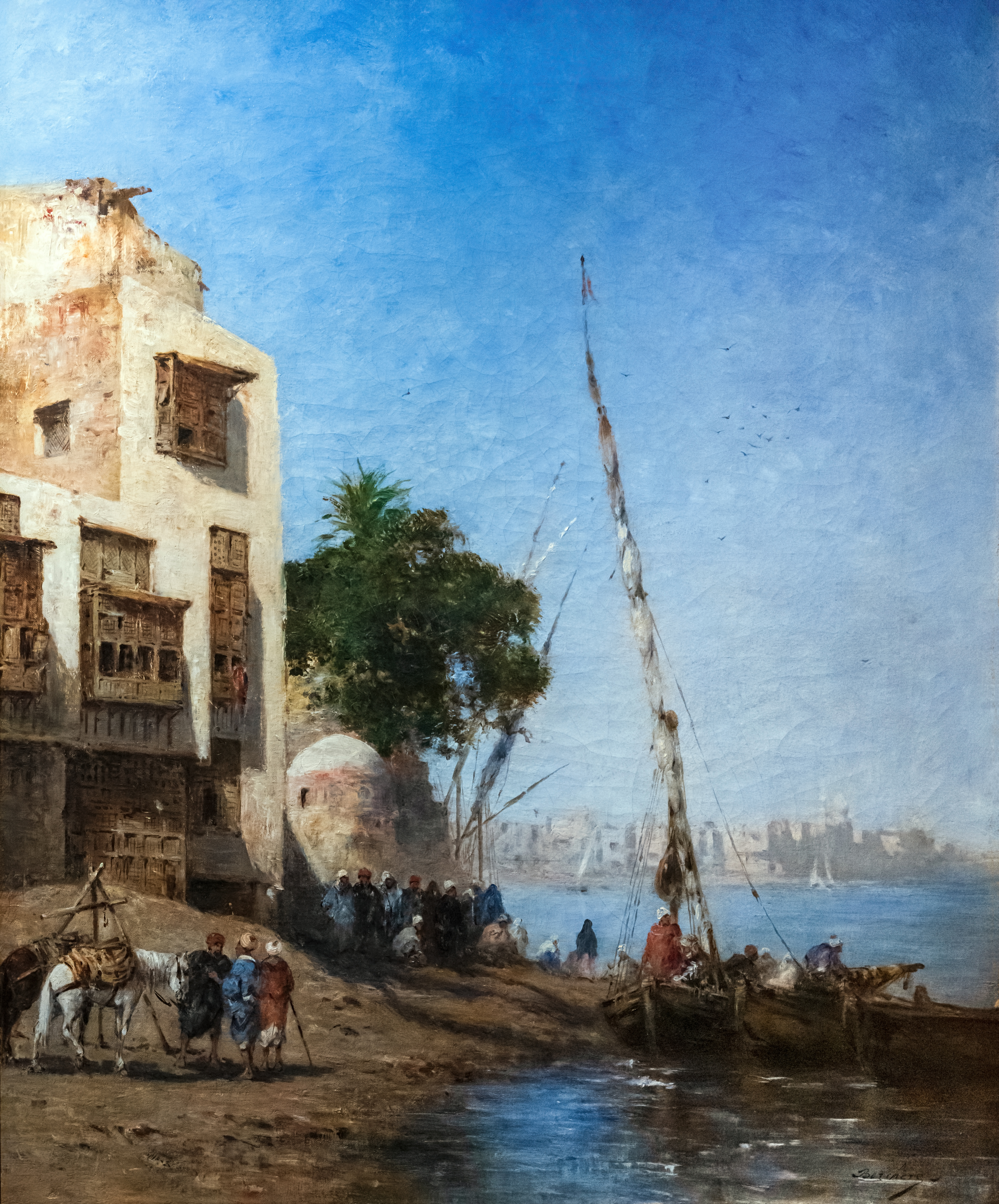
Waiting for boarding - Musée des Beaux-Arts de Narbonne

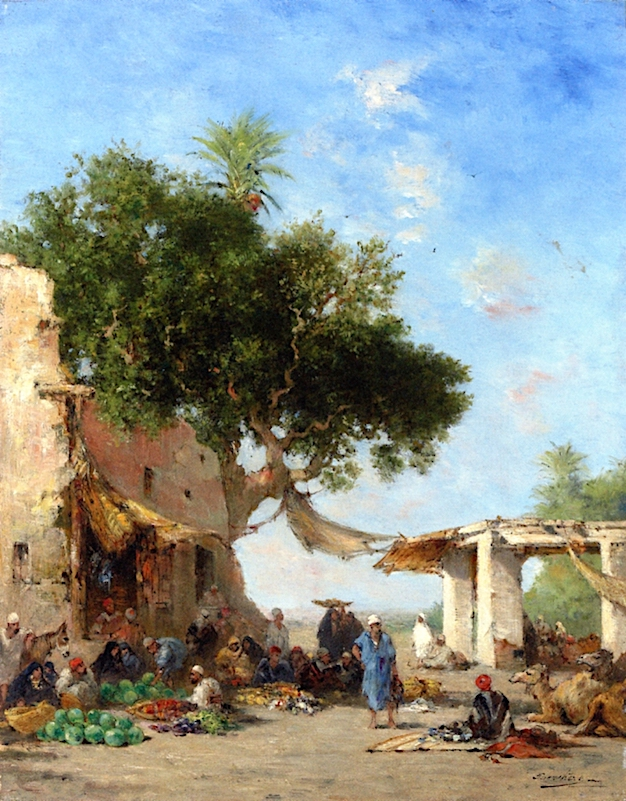
An Arab Market

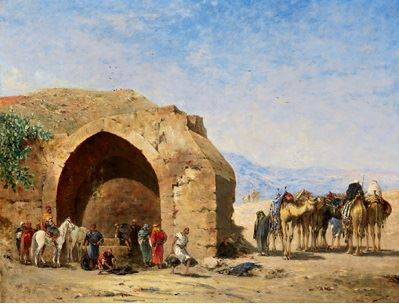
Stop at the Oasis

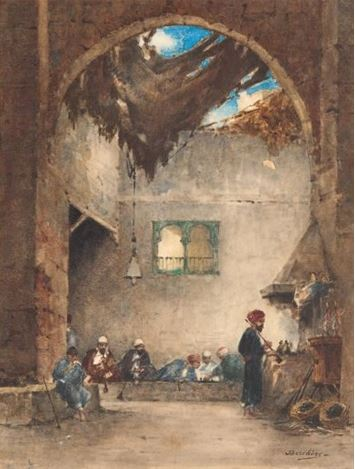
Café Interior

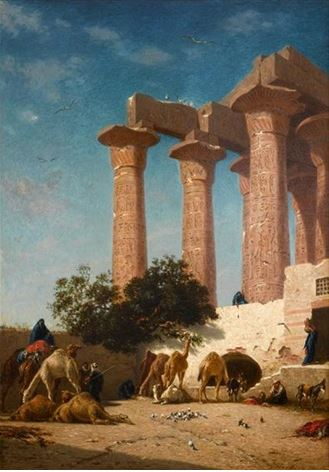
A Caravan

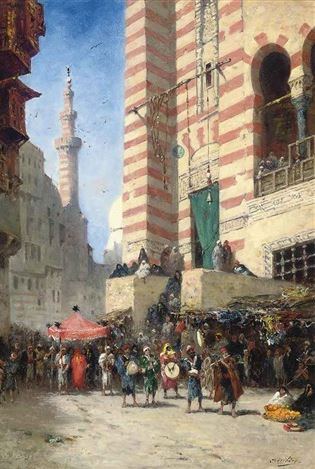
Procession in Cairo

== Writings ==
- Le désert du Sinaï, cinq mois dans l'isthme (The Sinai Desert; Five Months on the Isthmus), Hetzel, 1863. Online @ Google Books

== Sources ==
- Catalogue illustré des œuvres de N. Berchère, Paris: L. Baschet, 1885
- Gustave Geffroy: "Berchère, Narcisse". In: Ulrich Thieme, Felix Becker (Eds.): Allgemeines Lexikon der Bildenden Künstler von der Antike bis zur Gegenwart, Vol.3: Bassano–Bickham. Wilhelm Engelmann, Leipzig 1909, pg.372 Online
- Numa Broc, Dictionnaire des Explorateurs français du XIXe siècle, Vol.2, Asie, CTHS, 1992 ISBN 978-2-7355-0157-1
