= Jacques-Émile Blanche =

French painter (1861–1942)

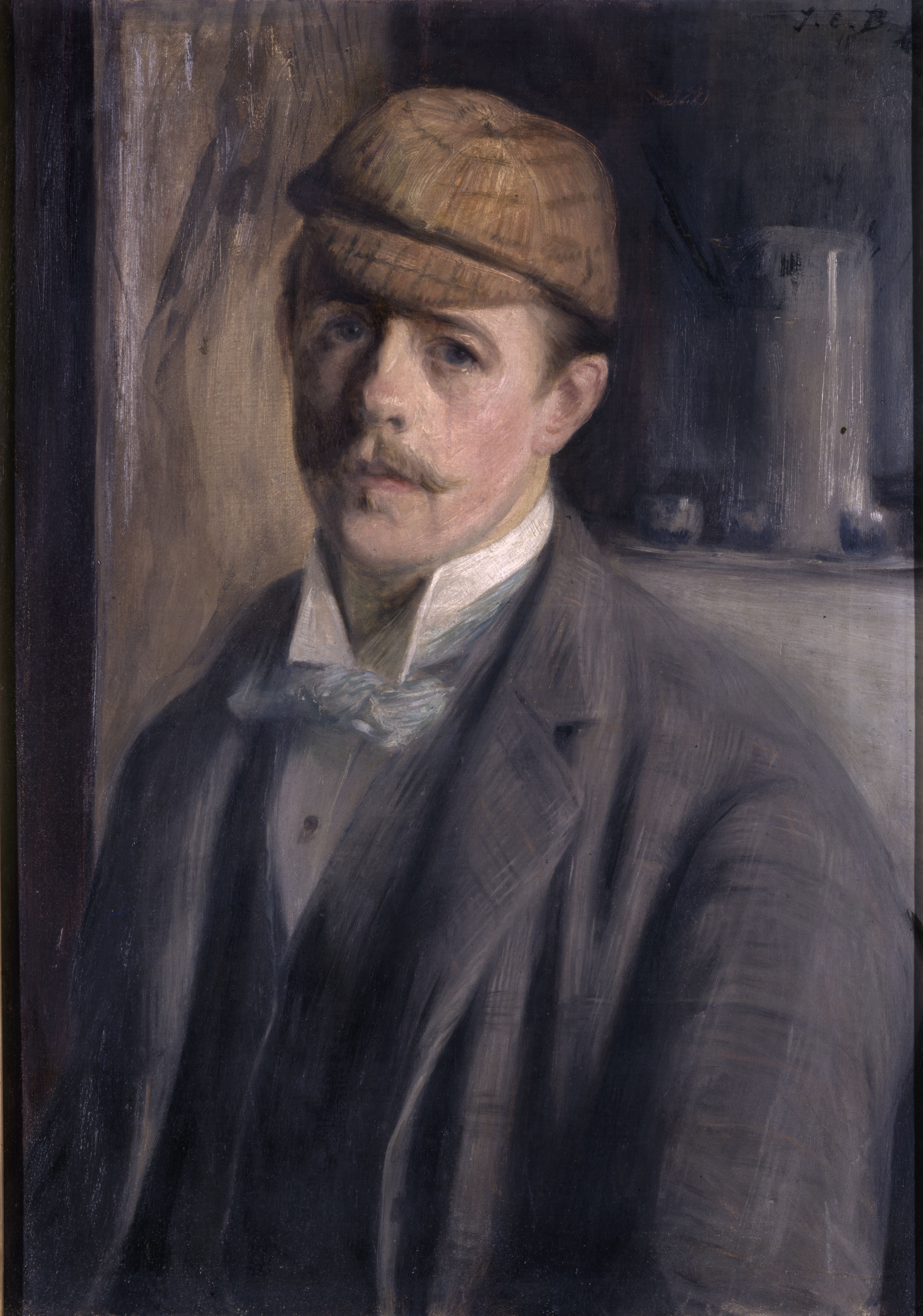
- Self-portrait c. 1890
- Born: Jacques-Émile Blanche; 1 January 1861; Paris, France
- Died: 30 September 1942 (aged 81); Offranville-en-Caux, Normandy, France
- Occupation: Painter

Jacques-Émile Blanche (French: [blɑ̃ʃ]; (1 January 1861 – 30 September 1942) was a French artist, largely self-taught, who became a successful portrait painter, working in London and Paris.

== Early life ==
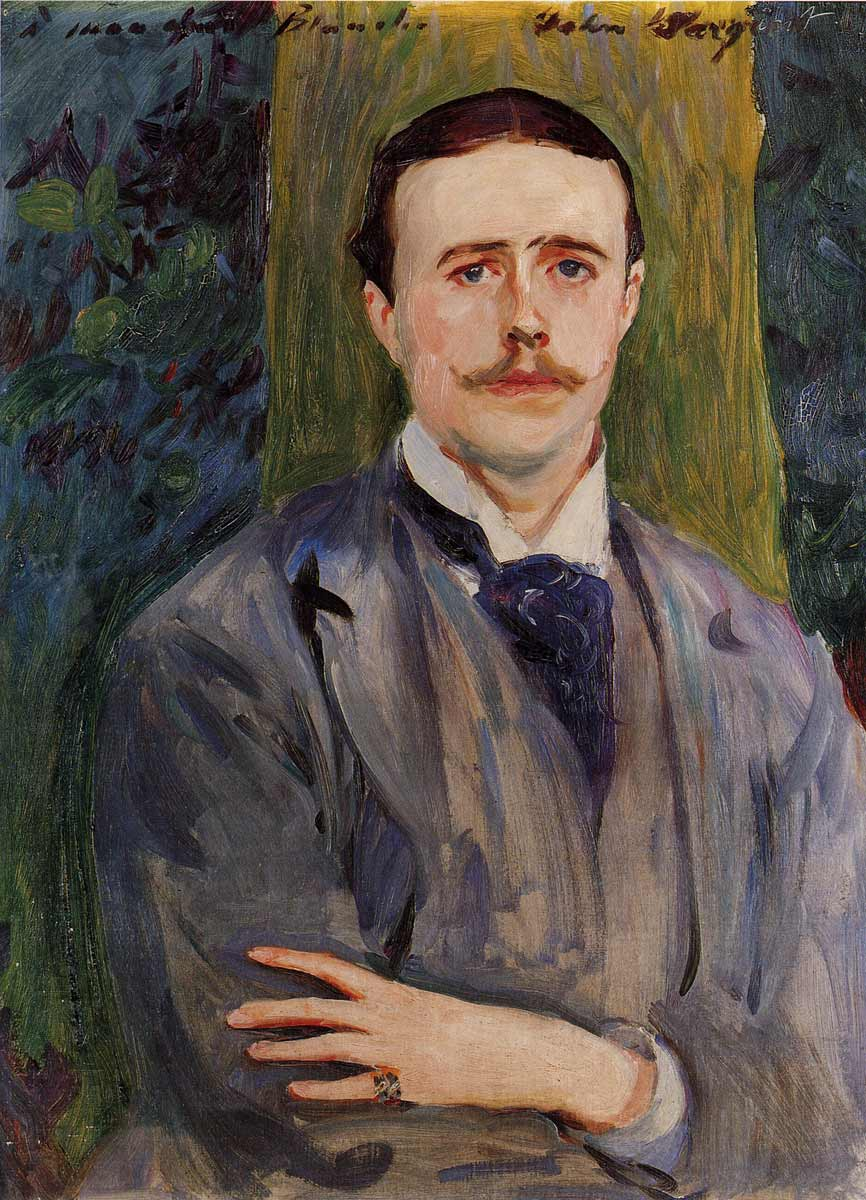
Portrait of Jacques-Émile Blanche, John Singer Sargent, c. 1886.

Blanche was born in the 16th arrondissement of Paris on January 1, 1861 and received his education at the prestigious Lycée Condorcet. His father, whose name he shared, was a successful psychiatrist who ran a fashionable clinic on the heights of Montmartre, and he was brought up in the rich Parisian neighborhood of Passy in a house that had belonged to the Princesse de Lamballe. As he grew up, he encountered many remarkable artists. His father's drawing room was frequented by many of the Parisian celebrities in literature and the arts — including Jules Michelet, Charles Renouvier, Hector Berlioz, Camille Corot, Louis Français, and numerous others. At Dr. Blanche's house there were regular Saturday meetings devoted either to some artistic performance or to conversation about aesthetic or literary subjects. Some of Berlioz's Les Troyens was first sung by Anne Charton-Demeur for guests of Dr. Blanche.

== Career ==
Although Blanche received some instruction in painting from Henri Gervex and Pierre-Auguste Renoir, he may be regarded as self-taught. He became a successful portrait painter, with a style derived from 18th-century English painters such as Thomas Gainsborough as well as Édouard Manet and John Singer Sargent. He worked in London, where he spent time from 1870 and was a member of the New English Art Club (NEAC). In Paris he exhibited at the Salon and the Société Nationale des Beaux-Arts. One of his closest friends was Marcel Proust, who helped edit several of Blanche's publications. He also knew Henry James and is mentioned in Gertrude Stein's The Autobiography of Alice B. Toklas. In Paris, at the Académie Vitti, he took a portraiture class with Canada’s first female battlefield artist Mary Riter Hamilton.

In 1902, Jacques-Émile Blanche took over the direction of the Académie de La Palette, where he would remain director until 1911. He taught at the Académie Vitti in 1903.

Among the painter's most famous works are portraits of his father, Marcel Proust (private collection, Paris), the poet Pierre Louÿs, the Thaulow family (Musée d'Orsay, Paris), Aubrey Beardsley (National Portrait Gallery, London), and Yvette Guilbert and the infamous beauty Virginia Oldoini, Countess of Castiglione whom his father had treated for mental illness. Others he painted included James Joyce, Julia Stephen, Edgar Degas, Claude Debussy, Auguste Rodin, Colette, Thomas Hardy, John Singer Sargent, Charles Conder, Percy Grainger, and Tamara Karsavina as Stravinsky's Firebird.

Blanche purchased Les Grandes Baigneuses from his former teacher Pierre-Auguste Renoir, for 1,000 Francs. It was sold to Carroll Sargent Tyson, Jr. in 1927, and bequeathed to the Philadelphia Museum of Art in 1963.

== Personal life ==
Blanche was known in Parisian society to be homosexual, though closeted. After the Oscar Wilde trials, he married Rose Lemoinne, daughter of John Lemoinne, the journalist, publisher and editor of the influential Parisian newspaper Journal des Débats. One of his lovers may have been the Spanish painter Rafael de Ochoa, from who Blanche wrote that shared the "same tendencies", and features with him in a self-portrait.

Blanche died at his home in Offranville-en-Caux, Normandy, France, on 30 September 1942.

He was buried in the 2nd section of Passy Cemetery.

== Posterity ==
A street in Offranville and a street in Dieppe were named after him.

In Offranville, there is a museum located on the 2nd floor of the Maison du Parc du Colombier which brings together paintings, complete literary works, souvenirs, letters and photographs of the artist, his family and his works.

== Published works ==
He was the author of the unreliable Portraits of a Lifetime: the late Victorian era: the Edwardian pageant: 1870–1914 (London: J.M. Dent, 1937) and More Portraits of a Lifetime, 1918–1938 (London: J.M. Dent, 1939), about which Walter Sickert said "he is liable to twist things he hears or doesn't into monstrous fibs".

== Selected paintings ==
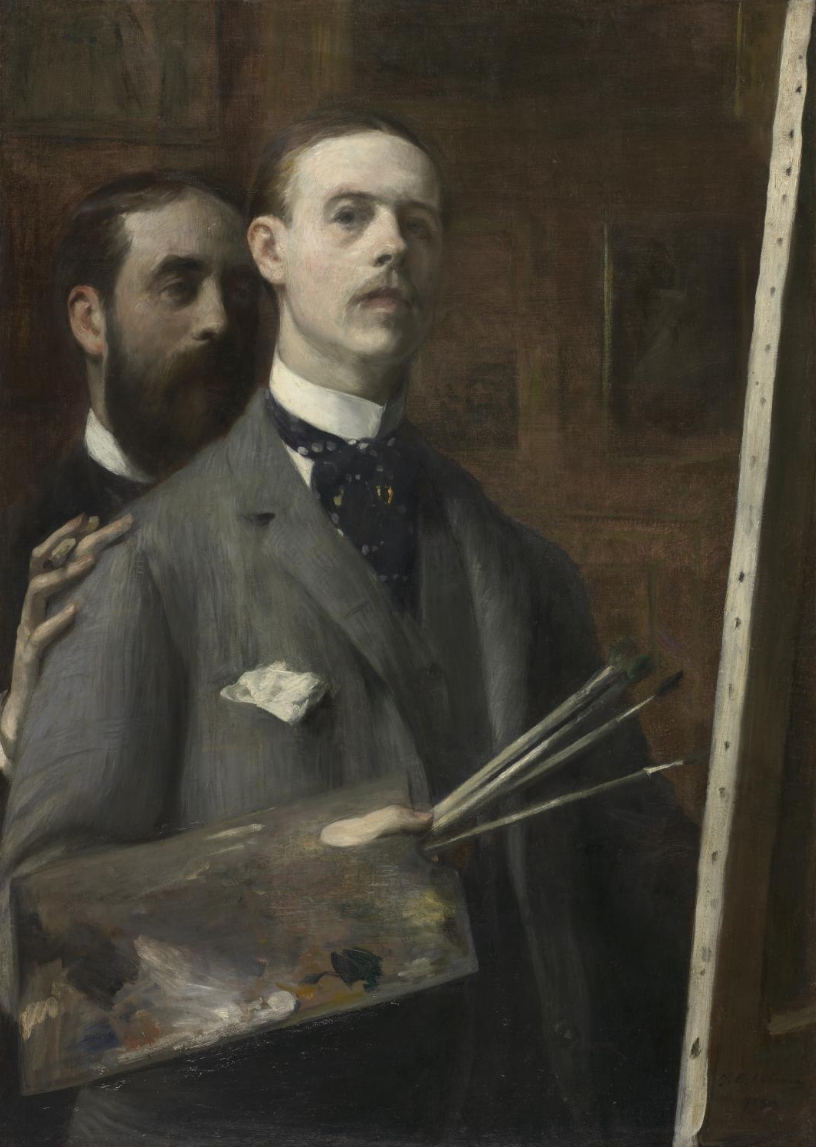
Self-Portrait with Raphael de Ochoa, 1890, Cleveland Museum of Art

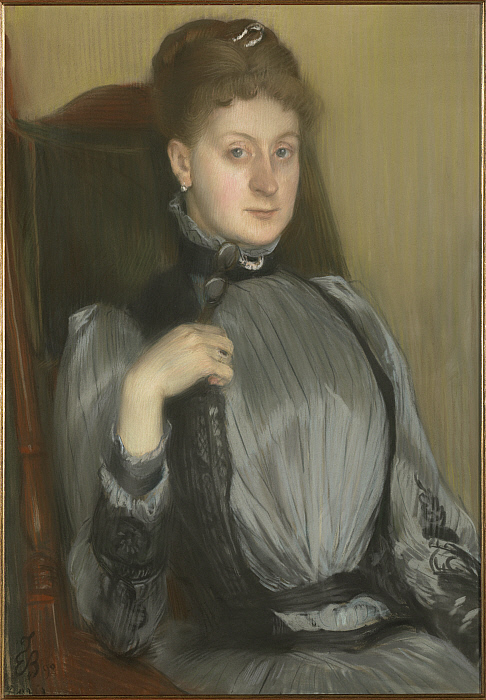
Portrait of a Woman (1890), Pastel on prepared canvas, 32 11/16 x 23 1/16 in. (83 x 58.5 cm), Clark Art Institute

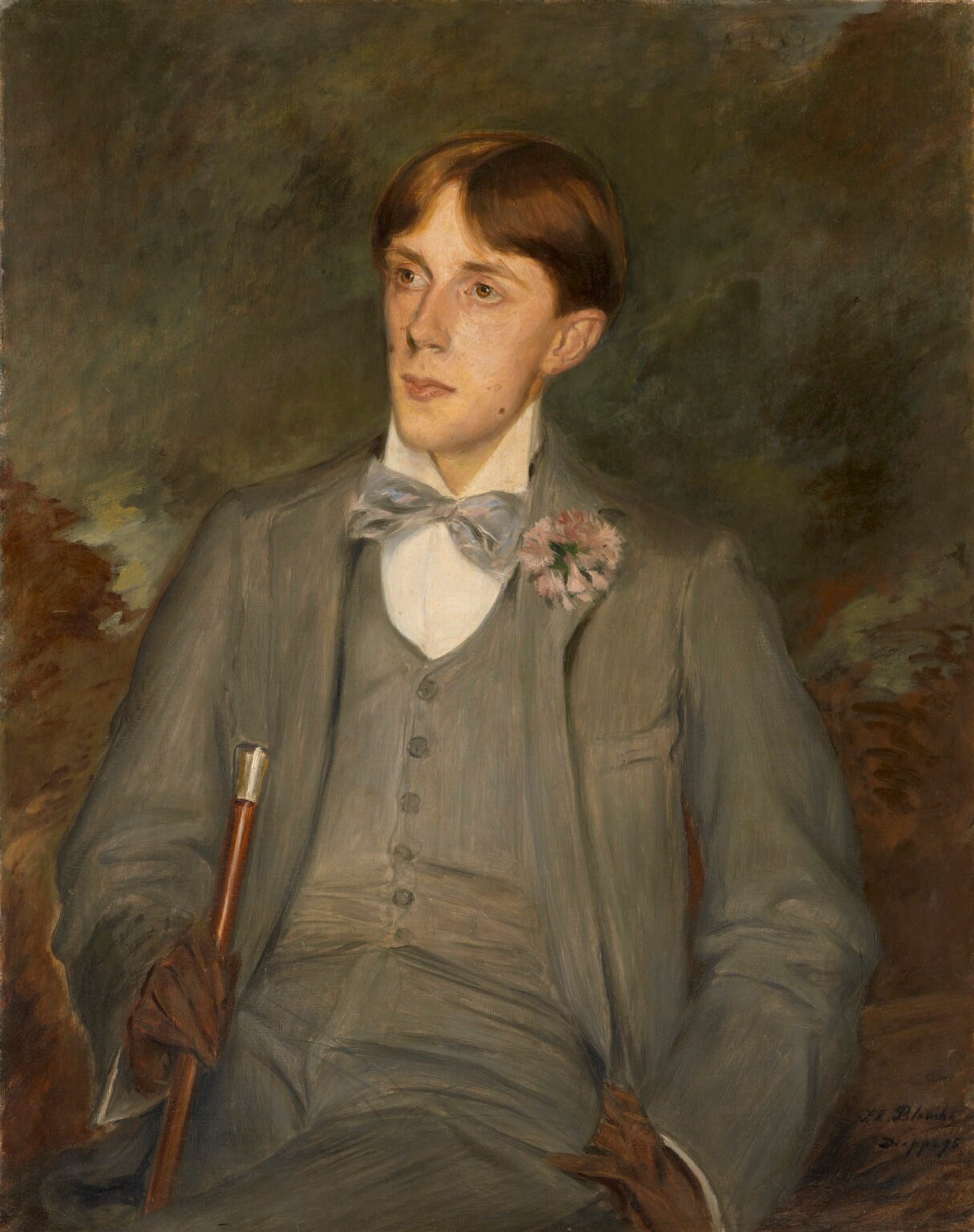
Aubrey Beardsley (1895)

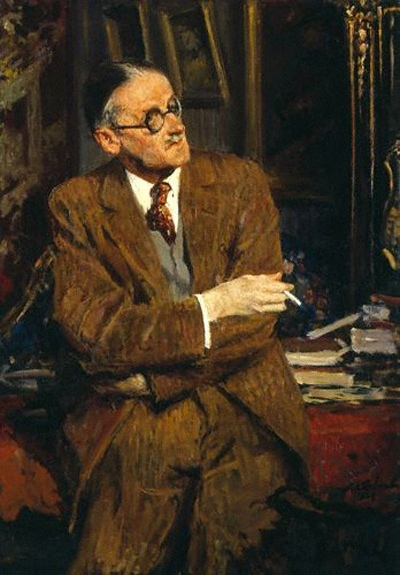
James Joyce (1935)

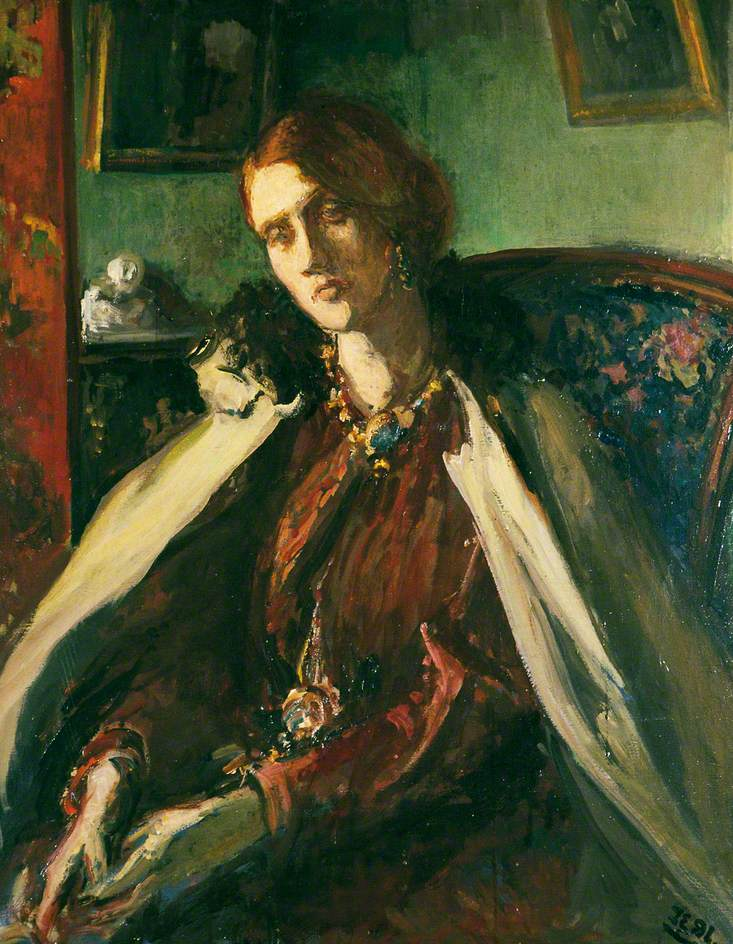
Julia Stephen

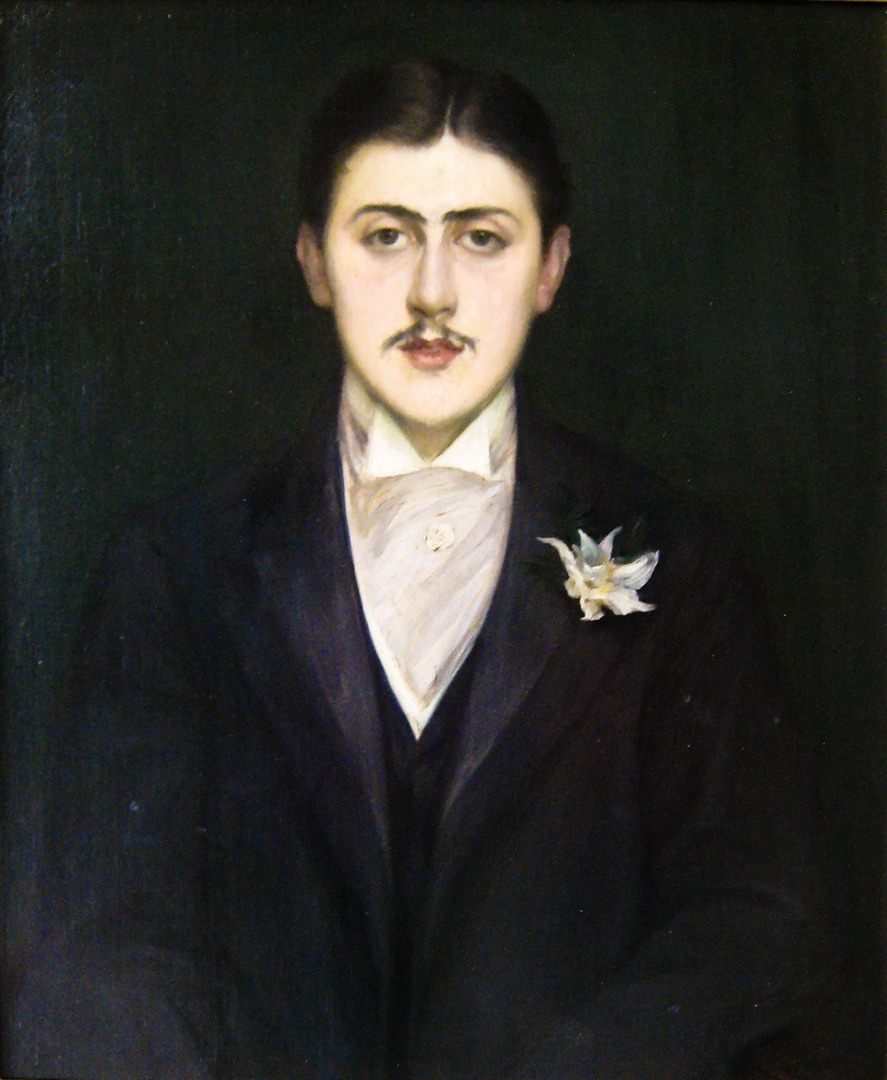
Marcel Proust (1892) at age 21

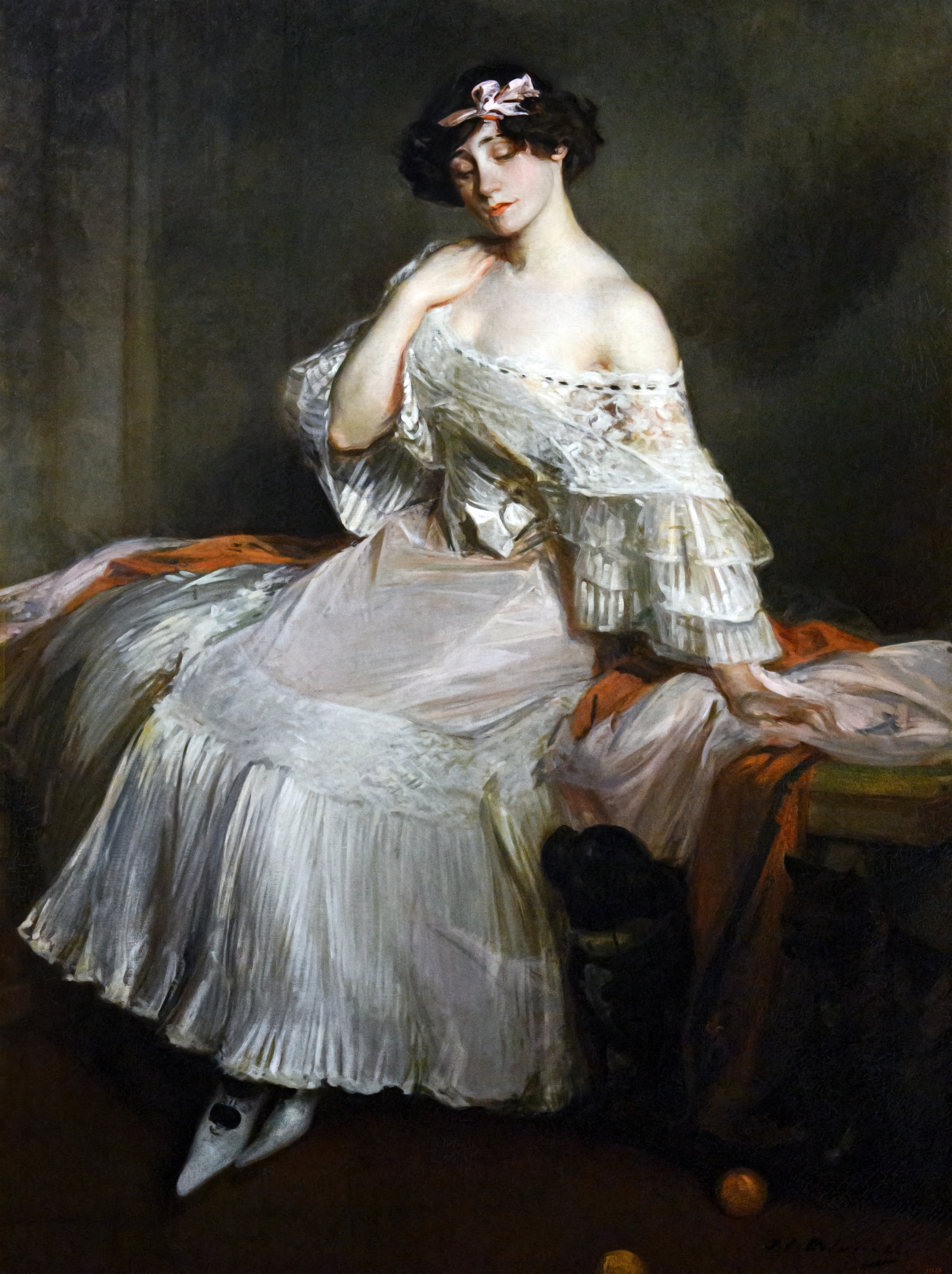
Portrait of Colette - Museu Nacional d'Art de Catalunya

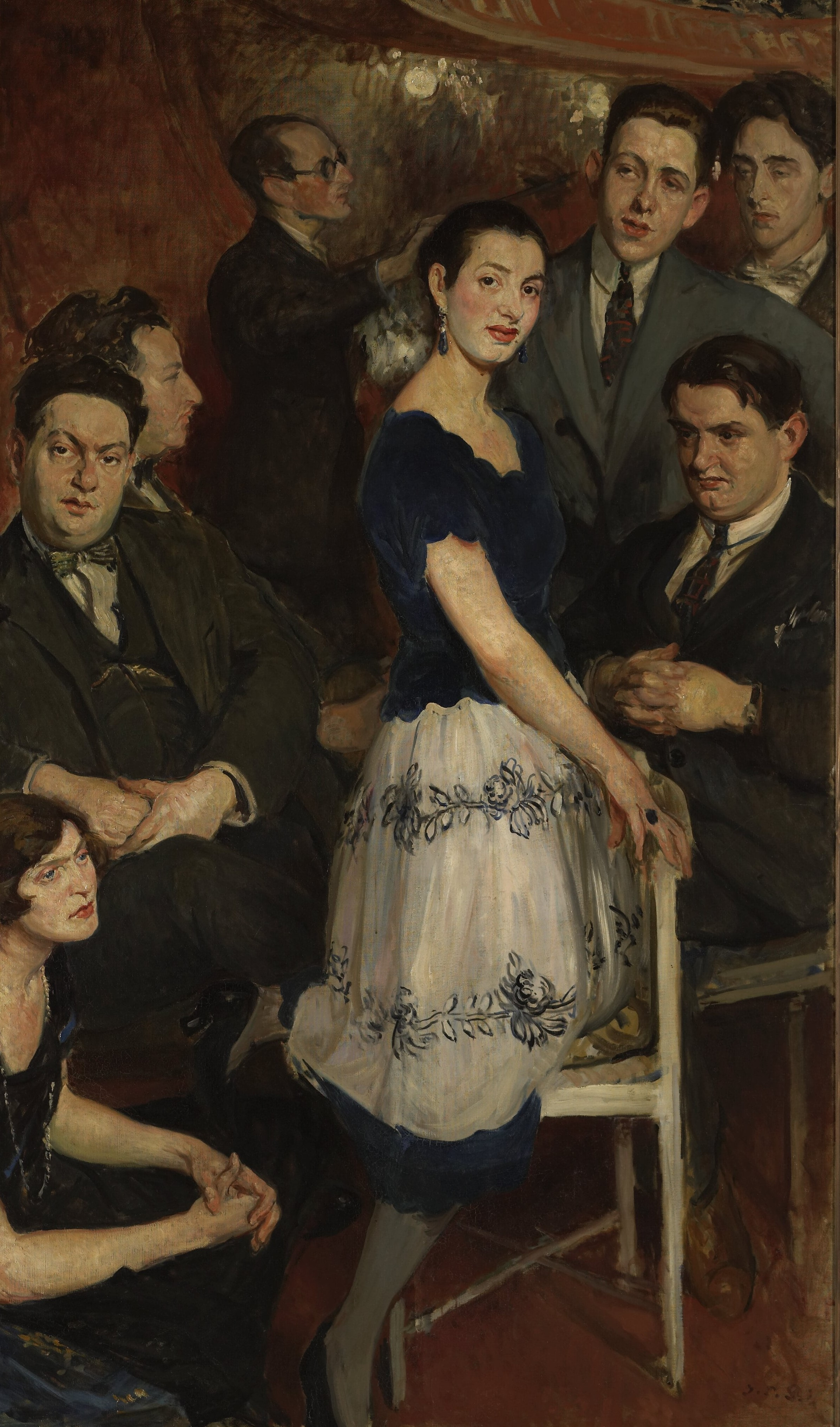
Les Six (1922)

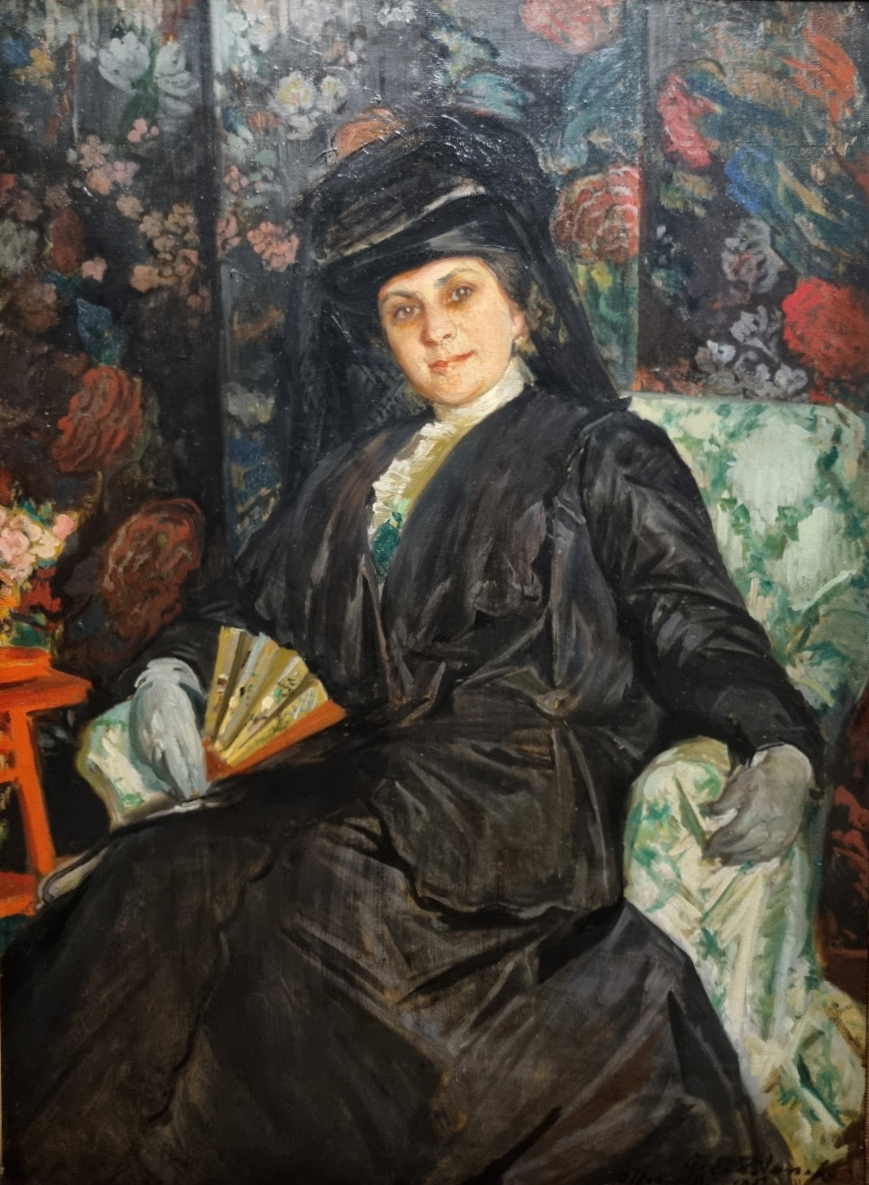
Florine Langweil (1912)

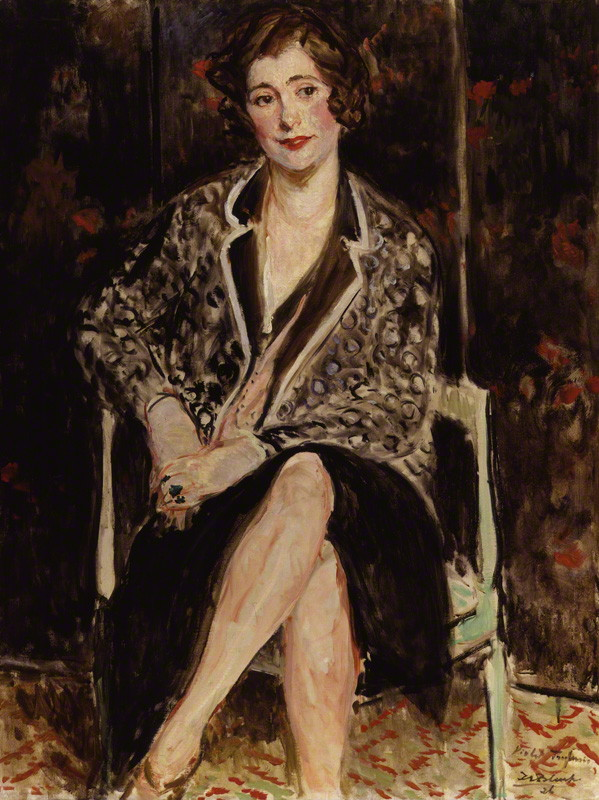
Violet Trefusis (1926)
