= Les Grandes Baigneuses (Renoir) =

Painting by Pierre-Auguste Renoir

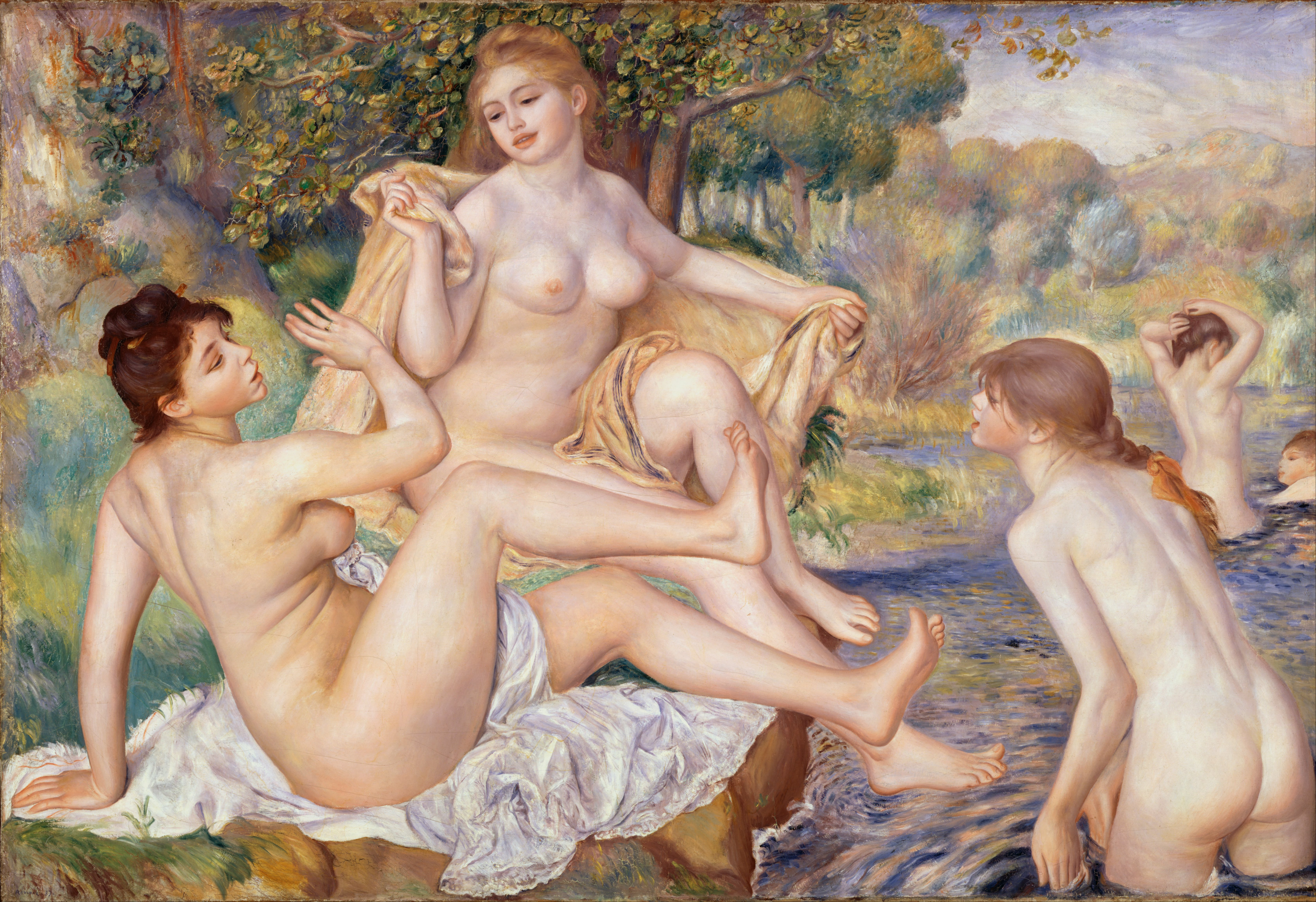
- Artist: Pierre-Auguste Renoir
- Year: 1884–1887
- Medium: Oil on canvas
- Dimensions: 115 cm × 170 cm (3' 10" in × 5' 5" in)
- Location: Philadelphia Museum of Art, Philadelphia

Les Grandes Baigneuses, or The Large Bathers, is a painting by Pierre-Auguste Renoir made between 1884 and 1887. The painting is in the Philadelphia Museum of Art, in Philadelphia.

The painting depicts a scene of nude women bathing. In the foreground, two women are seated beside the water, and a third is standing in the water near them. In the background, two others are bathing. The one standing in the water in the foreground appears to be about to splash one of the women seated on the shore with water. That woman leans back to avoid the expected splash of water.

== Painting ==
=== Influences ===
It is inspired at least in part by a sculpture by François Girardon, The Bath of the Nymphs (1672), a low lead relief realized for a fountain park of Versailles. The painting is also influenced by Veronese and Tiepolo, whose work Renoir greatly admired during his time in Venice. It also reflects the influence of the works of Ingres, and particularly the frescoes of Raphael, whose style he had absorbed during his trip to Italy in 1881-82. The latter two artists influenced Renoir's entire way of painting and drawing: he began to paint in a more disciplined and more conventional manner, gave up painting outdoors, and made the female nude – until then only an occasional subject– his main focus.

Additionally, Renoir greatly admired and was deeply influenced by the decorative Rococo style of the French painter François Boucher. Disillusioned by the rational and mechanized aesthetics of industrialization, Renoir became fascinated by the Rococo spirit of frivolous sensuality. The influence of Boucher’s paintings can be observed in the posing of Renoir’s foreground bathers with their legs crossing, mirroring Boucher’s 1742 Diana Bathing . This Rococo spirit of eroticism also manifests itself in Renoir’s depiction of his voluptuous bathers. Rococo art inspired him to experiment with what he regarded as a decorative mode of painting in The Great bathers. The painting was exhibited under the title, Les grandes baigneuses; Essai de peinture décorative, indicating his ornamental conception of the work's style.

=== Composition and technique ===
Renoir worked on The Bathers for three years until he was content with its composition. During that time, he made over 20 studies and sketches, including at least two full-sized figure drawings of the theme. The painting was composed using contradictory artistic styles and techniques. The left side of the painting is more indebted to the Classical tradition whereas the right portion is more consistent with Impressionism.

The two large bathers dominating the left side of the painting have a highly real, sculpture-like quality. The artist uses precise lines and edges to clearly delineate between these two figures and the background. Renoir also uses lines to define the features of these two nudes, capturing fine details such as the ears, hair, and lips, giving these bathers a lifelike, tactile quality. Prior to this painting, Renoir worked in the Impressionist style, painting directly onto the canvas, capturing his impressions of fleeting moments with quick, spontaneous brushstrokes. In contrast, the style of this painting, at least in its left half, has been described as "anti-Impressionist," as Renoir utilized a very different technique, carefully tracing the two large bathers onto the canvas from exact drawings of the figures.

The right side of the painting and the surroundings of these two large bathers show features of Renoir’s typical Impressionist style. The smaller bathers in the right background and the surrounding landscape were painted directly onto the canvas, with small, loose brush strokes. The features of the smaller nudes and the surrounding landscape are more blurred, less detailed, and less precise. The figures in the foreground have a sculptural quality, while the landscape behind them shimmers with impressionistic light. The combination of these two conflicting styles within the painting has a strange visual effect, making the two large bathers in the foreground appear like cut outs, pasted onto the painting.

With this new style, Renoir's intention was to reconcile the modern forms of painting with the painting traditions of the 17th and 18th centuries, particularly those of Ingres and Raphael. Renoir also admired the works of Rubens and Titian, and he tried to find a compromise between the styles of these old masters and the new Impressionist style.The Bathers may also be regarded as Renoir's pictorial testament. The models for the three bathers included two of his favorites: Aline Charigot, the seated blonde woman, whom Renoir married in 1890, and Suzanne Valadon, herself a painter and the mother of Maurice Utrillo.

== Reception ==
The painting was exhibited at the Petit Gallery in May 1887. Renoir considered this work to be his grand masterpiece and he reportedly expected viewers to be "dumbfounded" by the painting. The painting was controversial, but it did not generate the success or critical acclaim that Renoir had hoped to achieve. In particular, many critics strongly condemned Renoir’s combination of Rococo and Impressionist styles, indicating that the painting lacked aesthetic harmony. Some artists and critics, however, praised the new style of Renoir’s work. In particular, the Impressionist artists Berthe Morisot and Claude Monet greatly admired the painting. Monet stated, "Renoir made a superb painting of his bathers. Not understood by all, but by many." Renoir's painting had a strong influence on Paul Cézanne, who would also go on to complete a series of paintings depicting nude bathers in nature.

== Provenance ==
The painting was initially purchased by Jacques-Émile Blanche, Renoir's former student, for 1,000 Francs. It was sold to Carroll Sargent Tyson, Jr. in 1927, and bequeathed to the Philadelphia Museum of Art in 1963.

== See also ==
- List of paintings by Pierre-Auguste Renoir
