= Portrait of Prosper Marilhat =

Painting by Théodore Chassériau

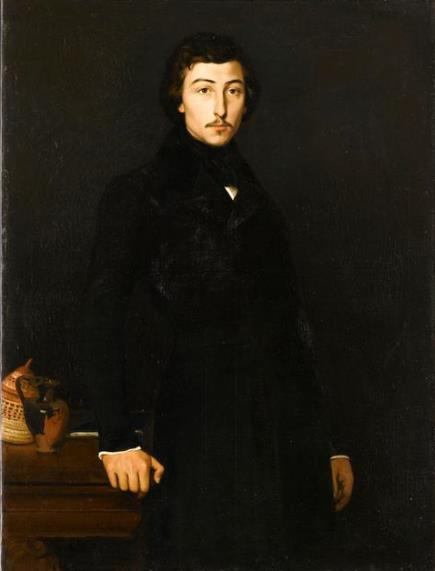
- Artist: Théodore Chassériau
- Year: 1835
- Type: Oil on canvas, portrait painting
- Dimensions: 129 cm × 98 cm (51 in × 39 in)
- Location: Louvre, Paris

Portrait of Prosper Marilhat is an 1835 portrait painting by the French artist Théodore Chassériau. It depicts his fellow painter Prosper Marilhat known for his Orientalist scenes. Chassériau was just sixteen when he produced the work, which he presented to the sitter who was his friend. It was displayed at the Salon of 1836 held at the Louvre in Paris. This was Chassériau's Salon debut.

Chassériau went on to become one of the leading artists of the Romantic movement. The picture appeared in a number of exhibitions following Chassériau's death in 1856, including the Exposition Universelle of 1878. The painting is today in the collection of the Louvre which acquired it in 1906.

== Bibliography ==
- Guégan, Stéphane. Théodore Chassériau, 1819–1856: The Unknown Romantic. Metropolitan Museum of Art, 2002.
- Sandoz, Marc Théodore Chassériau, 1819-1856: Catalogue raisonné des peintures et estampes. 1974.
