= Carroll Sargent Tyson, Jr. =

Carroll Sargent Tyson, Jr. (1878-1956) was an American painter and art collector from Chestnut Hill, Philadelphia. His paintings and prints are in the collections of the Philadelphia Museum of Art and the Woodmere Art Museum.

Tyson purchased Les Grandes Baigneuses by Pierre-Auguste Renoir from Jacques-Émile Blanche in 1927. It was bequeathed to the Philadelphia Museum of Art in 1963.
