= Offranville =

- Commune
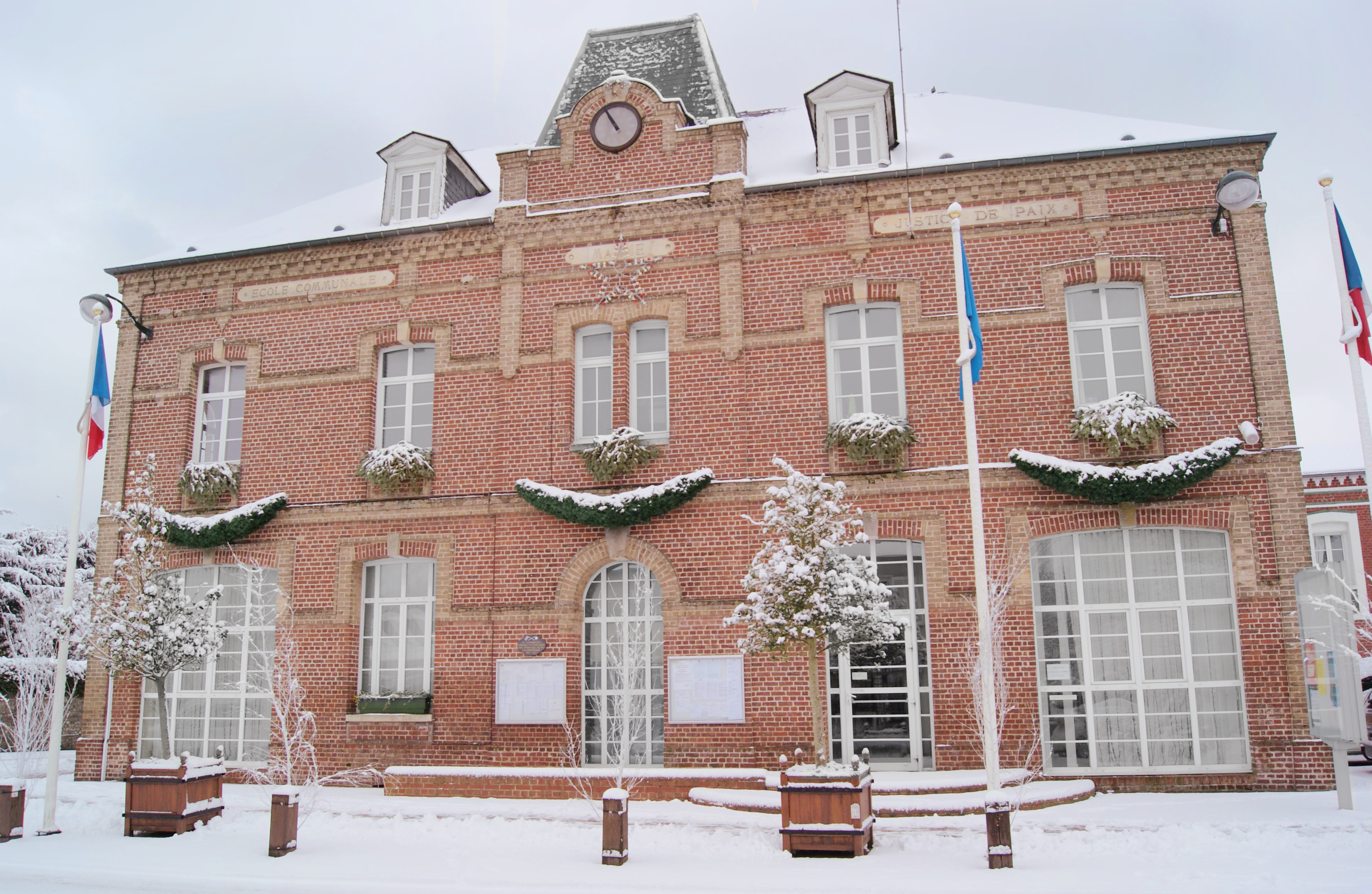
- The town hall in Offranville

- Coat of arms
- Location of Offranville
- Location within France Location within Normandy
- Coordinates: 49°52′18″N 1°02′57″E
- Country: France
- Region: Normandy
- Department: Seine-Maritime
- Arrondissement: Dieppe
- Canton: Dieppe-1
- Intercommunality: CA Région Dieppoise

Government
  - Mayor (2020–2026): Imelda Vandecandelaère
- Area^{1}: 17.34 km^{2} (6.70 sq mi)
- Elevation: 80 m (260 ft)
- Highest elevation: 92 m (302 ft)
- Lowest elevation: 8 m (26 ft)
- Population (2023): 3,242
  - Density: 187.0/km^{2} (484.2/sq mi)
- Time zone: UTC+01:00 (CET)
  - Summer (DST): UTC+02:00 (CEST)
- INSEE/Postal code: 76482 /76550
- ^{1} French Land Register data, which excludes lakes, ponds, glaciers > 1 km^{2} (0.386 sq mi or 247 acres) and river estuaries.

Offranville (French pronunciation: [ɔfʁɑ̃vil]) is a commune in the Seine-Maritime department in the Normandy region in north-western France.

== Geography ==
A small town of farming and light industry situated in the Pays de Caux at the junction of the D55, the D54 and the D237 roads, some 5 miles (8.0 km) south-west of Dieppe. The river Scie forms most of the commune's eastern border with Saint-Aubin-sur-Scie.

== Heraldry ==
Arms of Offranville	The arms of Offranville are blazoned : Quarterly 1: Or, a cross gules between 16 alerions azure; 2: Barry argent and gules, a lion sable crowned Or; 3: Tierced per fess a: azure, b: Or, a semi-circle couped azure c: argent, 3 ducks sable beaked and membered gules; 4: Gules, 2 batons raguly in saltire Or between a crescent argent and 3 mullets of 5 Or.

== Population ==
Historical population
Year	Pop.	±% p.a.
1968	2,040	—
1975	2,236	+1.32%
1982	2,930	+3.94%
1990	3,059	+0.54%
1999	3,470	+1.41%
2007	3,323	−0.54%
2012	3,309	−0.08%
2017	3,119	−1.18%
2023	3,242	+0.65%
Source: INSEE

== People ==
Jacques-Émile Blanche (1861–1942), artist, lived and died here.

== Places of interest ==
- The church of St.Ouen, dating from the sixteenth century, with a twisted spire.
- A 1000-year-old yew tree, 7 metres (23 feet) in circumference.
- Three châteaux and their parks.
- The Jacques-Émile Blanche museum.

== Twin towns ==
- Thurmaston, Leicestershire, United Kingdom

== See also ==
- Communes of the Seine-Maritime department
