= Pilgrims going to Mecca =

Painting by Léon Belly

Pilgrims Going to Mecca
- Pèlerins allant à La Mecque
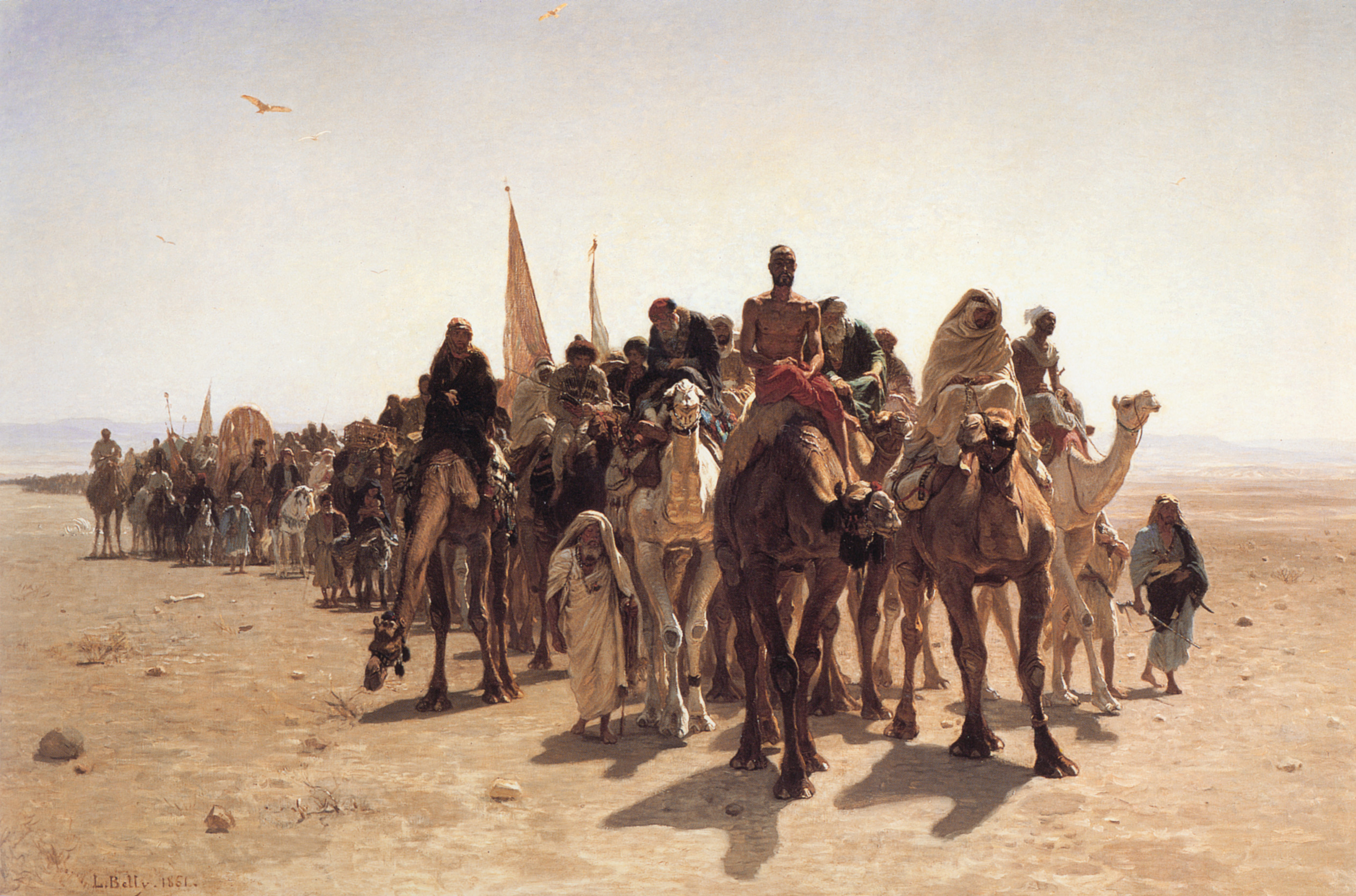
- Léon Belly Pilgrims going to Mecca
- Artist: Léon Belly
- Year: 1861
- Dimensions: 1,610 mm (63 in) × 2,420 mm (95 in)
- Identifiers: Joconde work ID: 000PE000077; Bildindex der Kunst und Architektur ID: 20044027

Pilgrims going to Mecca (French: Pèlerins allant à La Mecque) is a painting by Léon Belly. It is a very large (160 cm x 242 cm) oil on canvas work. It won a first class medal at the Salon of 1861, was bought by the state from the artist, and originally displayed at the Musée du Luxembourg. Since 1983 it has been part of the collection at the Musée d'Orsay, in Paris. From the time it was first exhibited it has been considered a masterpiece of orientalist painting.

== Subject ==
The work depicts a caravan of Muslims going on the Hajj pilgrimage to Mecca. In 1856, the artist had come across such a caravan while he was in Egypt and then worked for nearly three years to create this work. The precision with which Belly depicted both the camels and the human figures gives this painting an almost photographic quality.

Compared with many more romantic portrayals of Middle Eastern people, Belly’s work is both realistic and sympathetic. His pilgrims are elderly, tired, and very ordinary looking, though their composure, as well as the work’s composition, lend them a quality of nobility. Belly was concerned to portray an ethnographically exact image of a pilgrimage. One of the most important elements of the painting is the way it uses the effects of light. Additionally, it was one of the first orientalist works to give prominence to the camel.

== History ==
The painting has been featured in numerous exhibitions, including:

- 1861 Salon - palais des Champs Elysées - Paris
- 1867 Exposition Universelle - Paris
- 1873 Vienna World's Fair
- 1977 Léon Belly - Saint-Omer 1827-Paris 1877 - Rétrospective, fr: Musée de l'hôtel Sandelin - Saint-Omer
- 1984 The Orientalists : Delacroix to Matisse - European painters in North Africa and the Near East, Royal Academy of Arts - London
- 2008-9 Orte der Sehnsucht. Mit Kunstlern auf Reisen, Westphalian State Museum of Art and Cultural History - Münster
- 2014 AlHajj - Institut du monde arabe - Paris
- 2015 El canto del cisne. Pinturas académicas del Salón de Paris. Colecciones Musée d'Orsay - Fundación Mapfre - Madrid
