= Léon Belly =

French painter

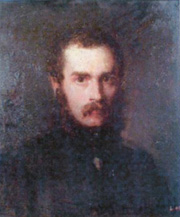
- Léon Belly, self-portrait, date unknown
- Born: 1827; St. Omer, France
- Died: 1877; Paris, France
- Education: Troyon, Théodore Rousseau
- Movement: Orientalist

Léon Auguste Adolphe Belly (1827–1877) was a French landscape painter.

== Life ==
Belly was born at St. Omer, in 1827. He studied under Troyon, and in 1849 visited Barbizon where he came under the influence of Théodore Rousseau.

In 1850–1 he travelled to Greece, Syria, and Egypt. In 1853 he made his debut at the Paris Salon, exhibiting four landscapes of Nablus and Beirut, and of the shores of the Dead Sea, which attracted critical acclaim. In 1855–6 he visited Egypt, travelling up the Nile in the company of another painter, Edouard Imer. A second trip to Egypt in 1856 was largely spent making studies for his painting Pilgrims going to Mecca, now in the Musée d'Orsay.

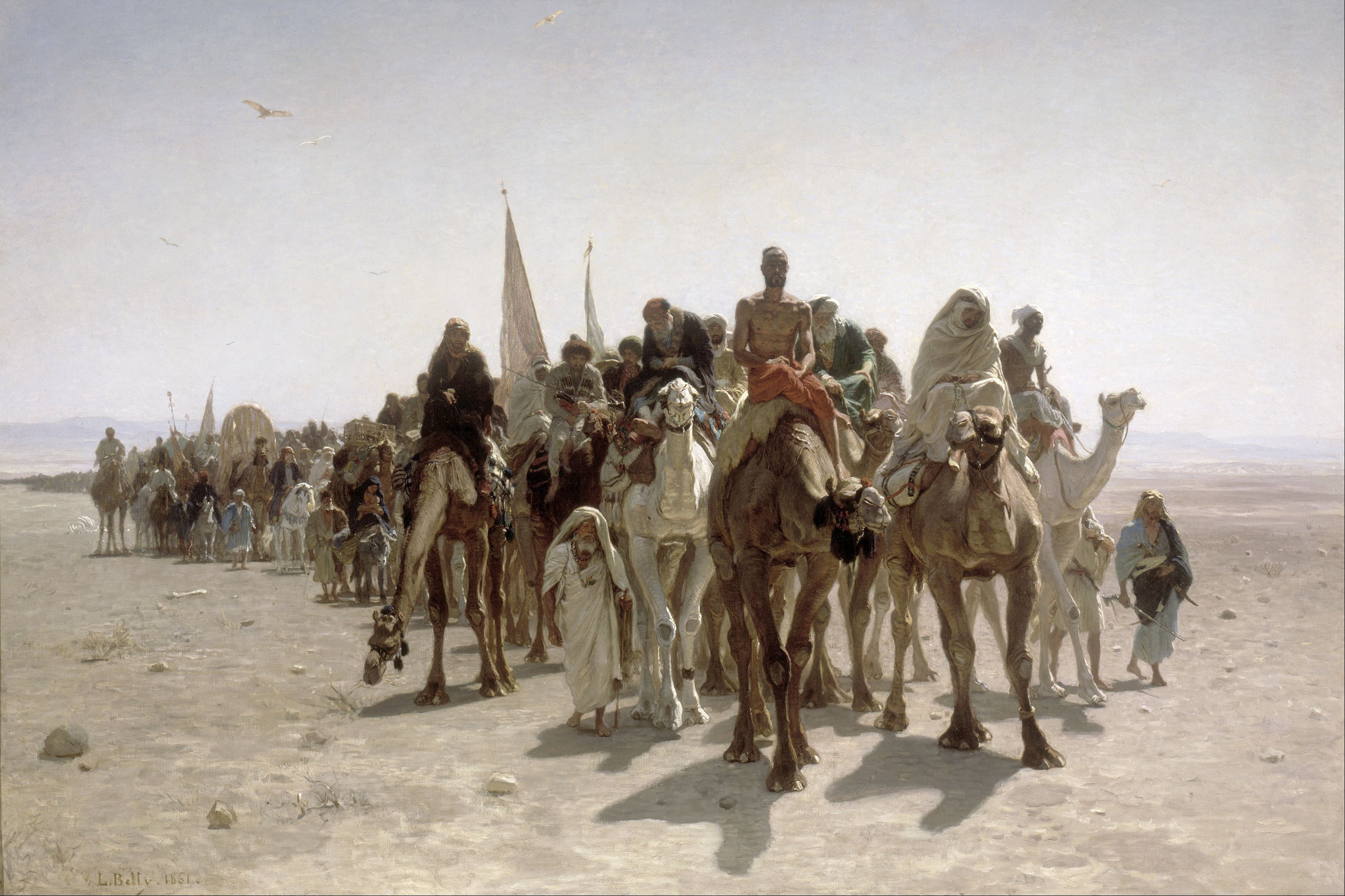
Pilgrims going to Mecca, painting from 1861. Now at the Musée d'Orsay.

As well as his paintings of Middle Eastern subjects he painted portraits and landscapes of Normandy and the Sologne throughout his career, and in 1867 bought land at Montboulan. He died in Paris in 1877.

== Works ==
His paintings include:

- Twilight in November.
- Fishers of équilles.
- The Desert of Nassoub. 1857.
- The Plain of Djyseh.
- Pilgrims going to Mecca, ("Pèlerins allant à la Mecque") 1861. Paris, Musée d'Orsay.
- The Banks of the Nile ("Bords du Nil (Vieux Caire), Barques"}. Saint-Omer, Musée de l'hôtel Sandelin.
- Approach to an Egyptian Village.
- The Dead Sea ("La Mer morte") 1866. Paris, Musée du quai Branly.
- The Nile — near Rosetta.
- Montboulan in Sologne ("le gué de Montboulan, en Sologne"), 1877. Paris, musée d'Orsay.

== Gallery ==
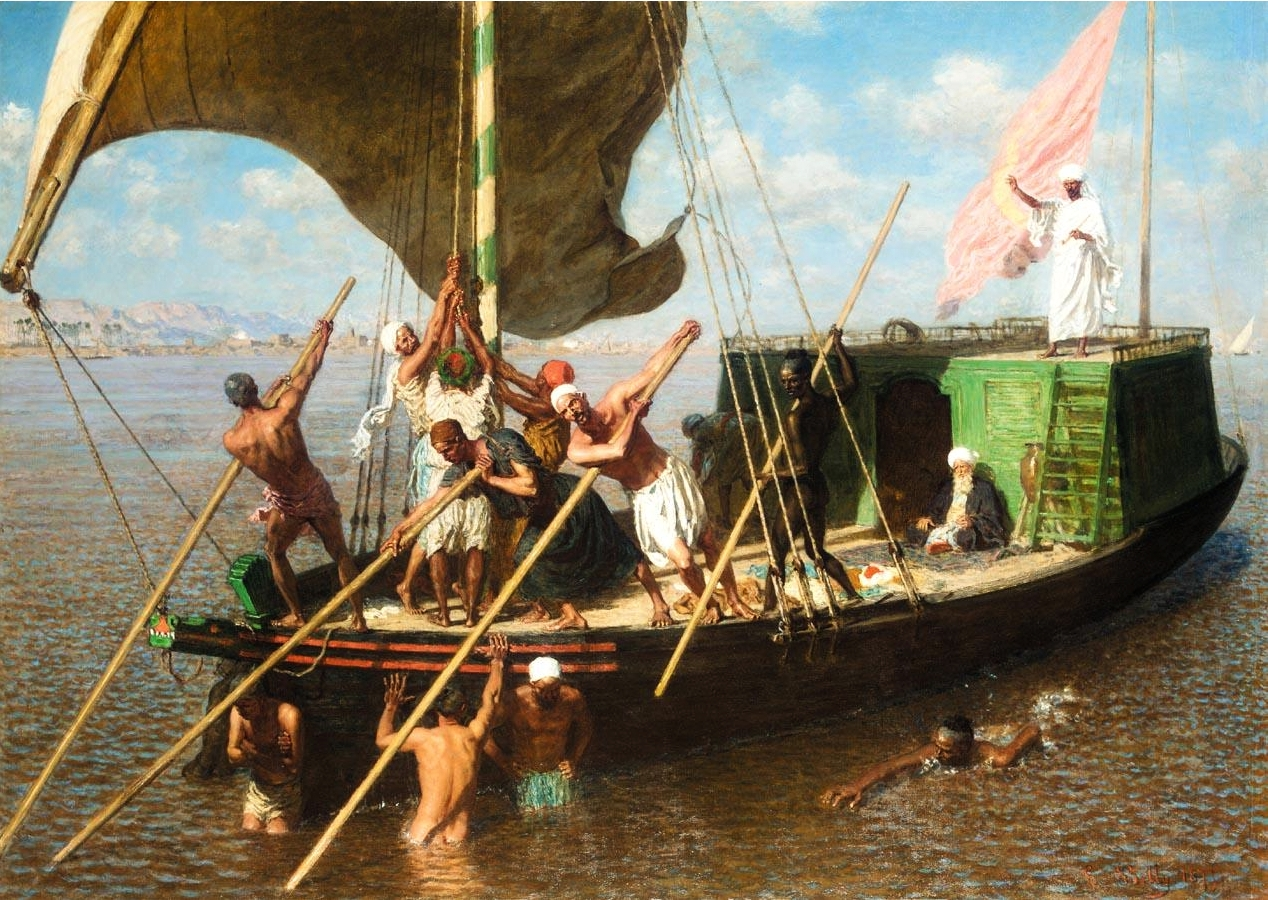
La dahabieh engravée

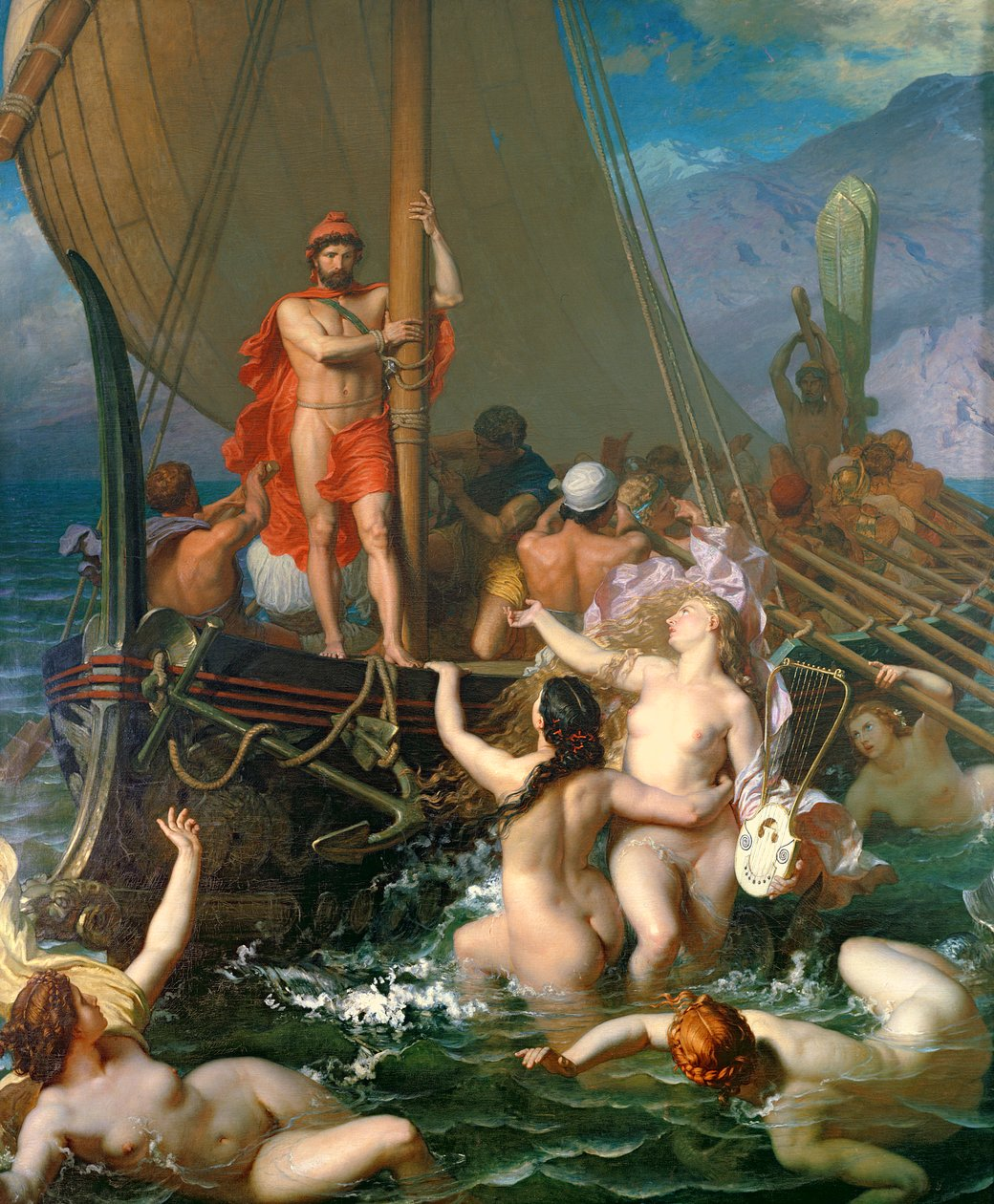
Ulysses And The Sirens by Léon Belly

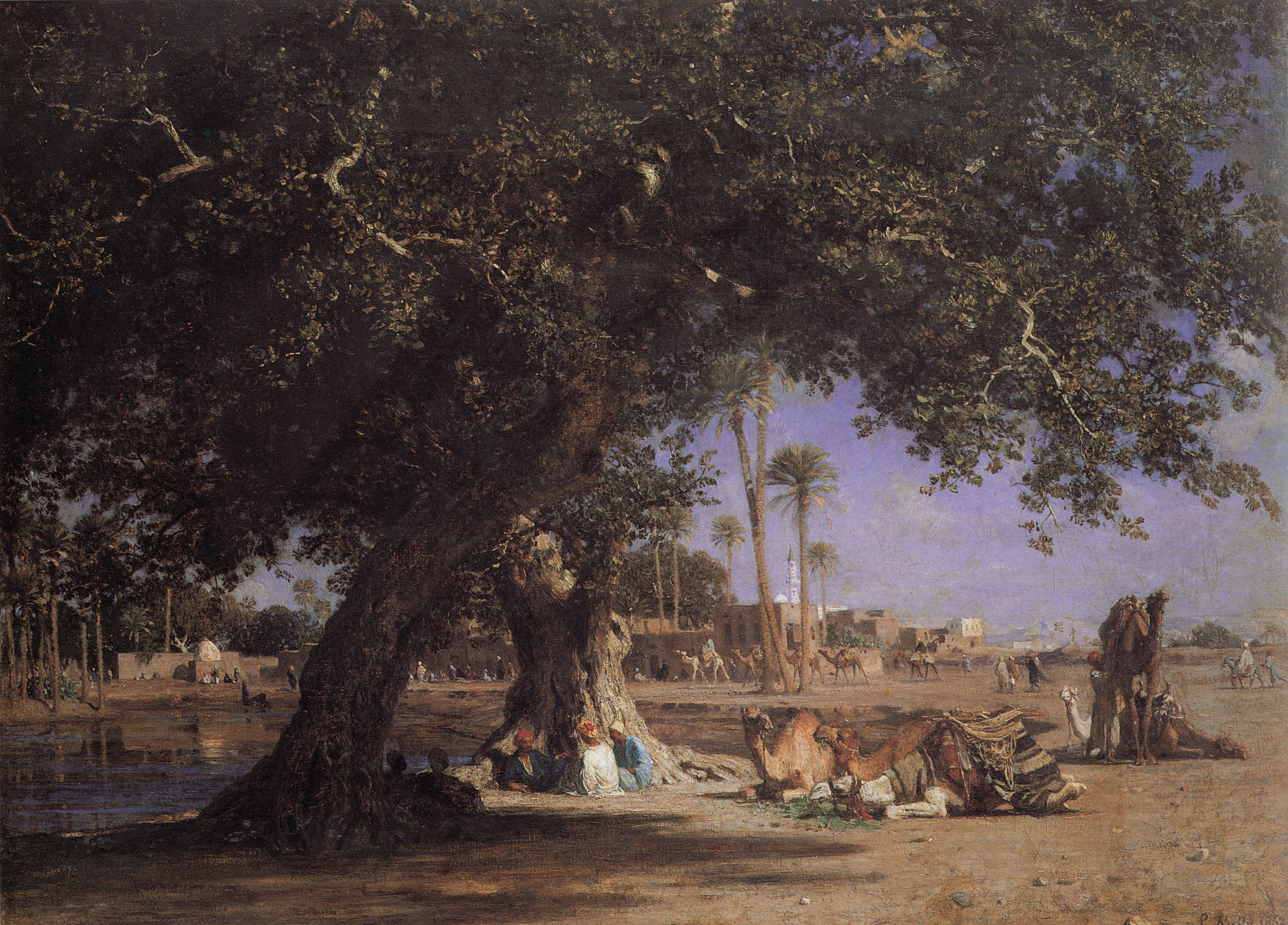
View of Shubra
