= Communauté de communes du Pays Neufchâtelois =

Coordinates: 49.7352°N 1.4392°E

Pays Neufchâtelois
- Former communauté de communes
- Interactive map of Pays Neufchâtelois
- Country: France
- Region: Normandy
- Department: Seine-Maritime
- No. of communes: {{{nbcomm}}}
- Established: 1 January 1998
- Disbanded: 2017
- Area: 233.44 km^{2} (90.13 sq mi)
- Population (1999): 11,428
  - Density: 48.955/km^{2} (126.79/sq mi)

The Communauté de communes du Pays Neufchâtelois is a former intercommunality in the Seine-Maritime département of the Normandy region of north-western France. It was created on 1 January 1998. It was merged into the new Communauté de communes Bray-Eawy in January 2017.

== Participants ==
The Communauté de communes comprised the following 23 communes:

- Auvilliers
- Bouelles
- Bully
- Callengeville
- Esclavelles
- Fesques
- Flamets-Frétils
- Fresles
- Graval
- Lucy
- Massy
- Ménonval
- Mesnières-en-Bray
- Mortemer
- Nesle-Hodeng
- Neufchâtel-en-Bray
- Neuville-Ferrières
- Quièvrecourt
- Saint-Germain-sur-Eaulne
- Saint-Martin-l'Hortier
- Saint-Saire
- Sainte-Beuve-en-Rivière
- Vatierville

== See also ==
- Communes of the Seine-Maritime department
