= Canton of Saint-Saëns =

Coordinates: 49°38′55″N 1°20′32″E

Saint-Saëns
- Former canton
- Interactive map of Saint-Saëns
- Country: France
- Region: Normandy
- Department: Seine-Maritime
- No. of communes: {{{nbcomm}}}
- Disbanded: 2015
- Area: 156.88 km^{2} (60.57 sq mi)
- Population (2012): 8,927
  - Density: 56.90/km^{2} (147.4/sq mi)

The Canton of Saint-Saëns is a former canton situated in the Seine-Maritime département and in the Haute-Normandie region of northern France. It was disbanded following the French canton reorganisation which came into effect in March 2015. It consisted of 15 communes, which joined the canton of Neufchâtel-en-Bray in 2015. It had a total of 8,927 inhabitants (2012).

== Geography ==
An area of farming and associated light industry in the arrondissement of Dieppe, centred on the town of Saint-Saëns. The altitude varies from 90m (Saint-Saëns) to 236m (Sommery) for an average altitude of 164m.

The canton comprised 15 communes:

- Bosc-Bérenger
- Bosc-Mesnil
- Bradiancourt
- Critot
- Fontaine-en-Bray
- Mathonville
- Maucomble
- Montérolier
- Neufbosc
- Rocquemont
- Sainte-Geneviève
- Saint-Martin-Osmonville
- Saint-Saëns
- Sommery
- Ventes-Saint-Rémy

== Population ==
Historical population Canton of Saint-Saëns
Year	1962	1968	1975	1982	1990	1999
Pop.	6,600	6,840	6,583	6,464	6,650	7,514
±%	—	+3.6%	−3.8%	−1.8%	+2.9%	+13.0%
From the year 1962 on: No double counting – residents of multiple communes (e.g. students and military personnel) are counted only once. Source: INSEE

== See also ==
- Arrondissements of the Seine-Maritime department
- Cantons of the Seine-Maritime department
- Communes of the Seine-Maritime department
