= Communauté de communes de Saint-Saëns-Portes de Bray =

Coordinates: 49.672°N 1.2843°E

Saint-Saëns-Porte de Bray
- Former communauté de communes
- Interactive map of Saint-Saëns-Porte de Bray
- Country: France
- Region: Normandy
- Department: Seine-Maritime
- No. of communes: {{{nbcomm}}}
- Established: 1994
- Disbanded: 2017
- Area: 158 km^{2} (61 sq mi)
- Population (2013): 9,092
  - Density: 57.5/km^{2} (149/sq mi)

The Communauté de communes de Saint-Saëns-Porte de Bray was located in the Seine-Maritime département of the Normandy region of northern France. It was created in January 1994. It was the first “Communauté de communes” to be created in the region. It was merged into the new Communauté de communes Bray-Eawy in January 2017.

== Participants ==
The Communauté de communes comprised the following communes:

- Bosc-Bérenger
- Bosc-Mesnil
- Bradiancourt
- Critot
- Fontaine-en-Bray
- Mathonville
- Maucomble
- Montérolier
- Neufbosc
- Rocquemont
- Sainte-Geneviève
- Saint-Martin-Osmonville
- Saint-Saëns
- Sommery
- Ventes-Saint-Rémy

== See also ==
- Communes of the Seine-Maritime department
