= Communauté de communes du Bosc d'Eawy =

Coordinates: 49.708°N 1.226°E

Bosc d'Eawy
- Former communauté de communes
- Interactive map of Bosc d'Eawy
- Country: France
- Region: Normandy
- Department: Seine-Maritime
- No. of communes: {{{nbcomm}}}
- Established: January 1, 2002
- Disbanded: 2017
- Area: 147.28 km^{2} (56.87 sq mi)
- Population (1999): 6,989
  - Density: 47.45/km^{2} (122.9/sq mi)

The Communauté de communes du Bosc d’Eawy was located in the Seine-Maritime département of the Normandy region of northern France. It was created on 1 January 2002. It was dissolved on 1 January 2017.

== Participants ==
The Communauté de communes comprised the following communes:

- Ardouval
- Beaumont-le-Hareng
- Bellencombre
- Bosc-le-Hard
- Bracquetuit
- Cottévrard
- Cressy
- La Crique
- Cropus
- Les Grandes-Ventes
- Grigneuseville
- Mesnil-Follemprise
- Pommeréval
- Rosay
- Saint-Hellier

== See also ==
- Communes of the Seine-Maritime department
