= Eawy Forest =

Forest in Normandy, France

Eawy Forest French: Forêt d'Eawy
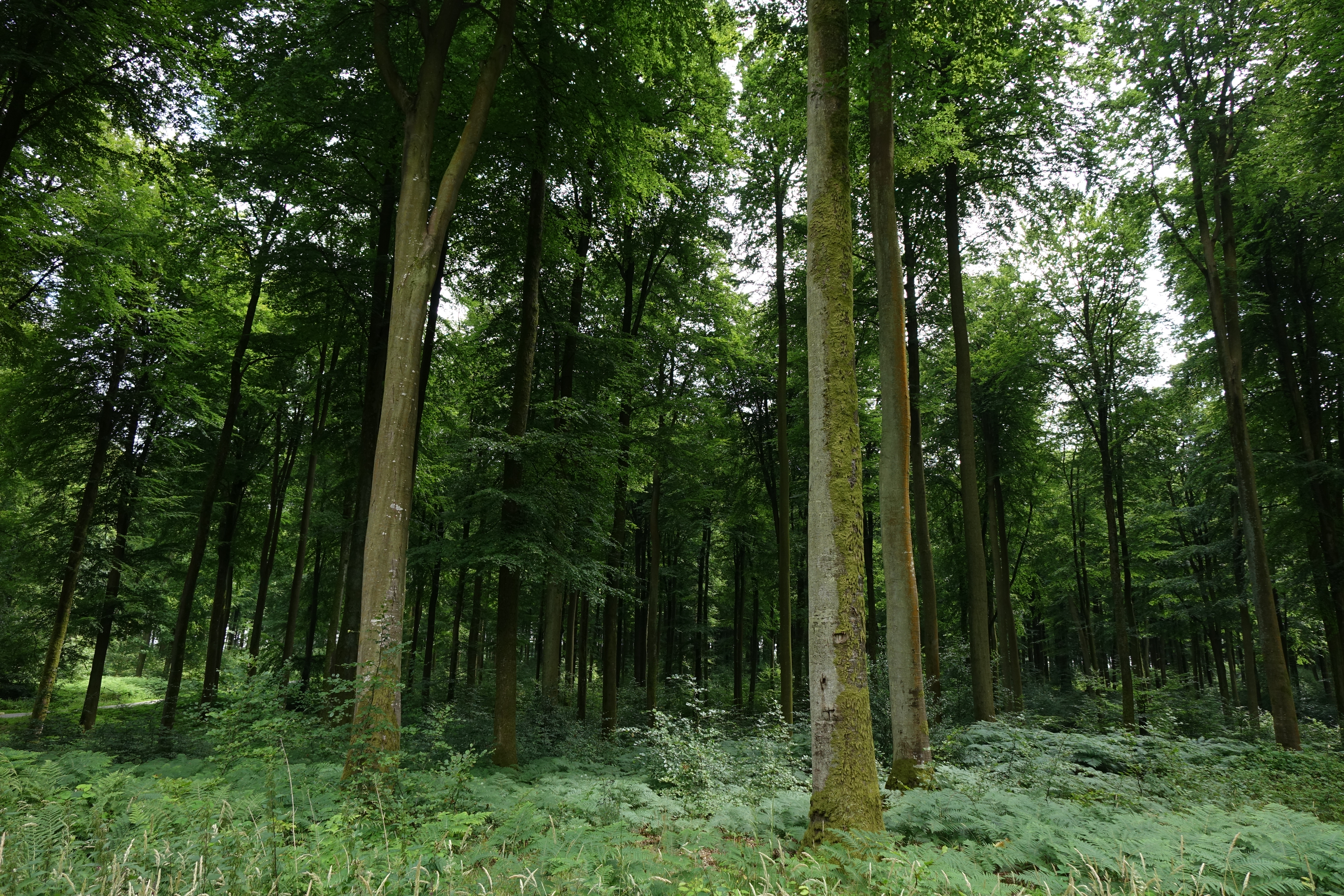
- Beech trees in the Eawy Forest

- Location within France
- Interactive map of Eawy Forest

Geography
- Location: Seine-Maritime, Normandy, France
- Coordinates: 49°44′14″N 01°14′31″E
- Elevation: 130–230 metres
- Area: 6,550 hectares (16,200 acres)

Administration
- Authority: National Forests Office (France)

Ecology
- Forest cover: beech
- Dominant tree species: Fagus sylvatica L.

The Eawy Forest is one of the biggest forests of the Pays de Bray in Normandy, France. It covers an area of 6550 hectares between the communes of Saint-Saëns and Dampierre-Saint-Nicolas, about 20 km south-east of Dieppe and not far from Neufchâtel-en-Bray. The village of Ventes-Saint-Rémy is located in the centre of a clearing.

== Toponymy ==
Eawy (pronounced [eavi], but previously [evi]) is an Old French term, derived from the noun eve, ewe an old form of the French word eau, meaning here "wet".

== Natural environment ==
The forest borders a large ridge which separates the Varenne in the SW from the Béthune in the NE; it is a small limestone plateau, varying in altitude between 130 and 230 metres, descending in a convex slope to the Varenne. Although the forest is not crossed by any watercourse, the flint clay which covers the limestone retains a fair amount of moisture.

Previously an oak plantation, it was transformed into a beech grove in the 19th century by the forestry workers. Thus it now mainly comprises beeches (Fagus sylvatica); there are also some oaks, hornbeams, ashes, wild cherry and sycamore maples. The forest is crossed, at its centre, by the Allée des Limousins, a mostly straight clearing 14 km long and 20 to 30 metres wide, cut in the 16th century by Gabriel de Limoges.

== Climate ==
There is an oceanic climate, with mean annual precipitation of 950 mm and a mean annual temperature around 10.1 °C and a narrow temperature range (4.5 °C in January, 16.5 °C in August).

== History and exploitation ==
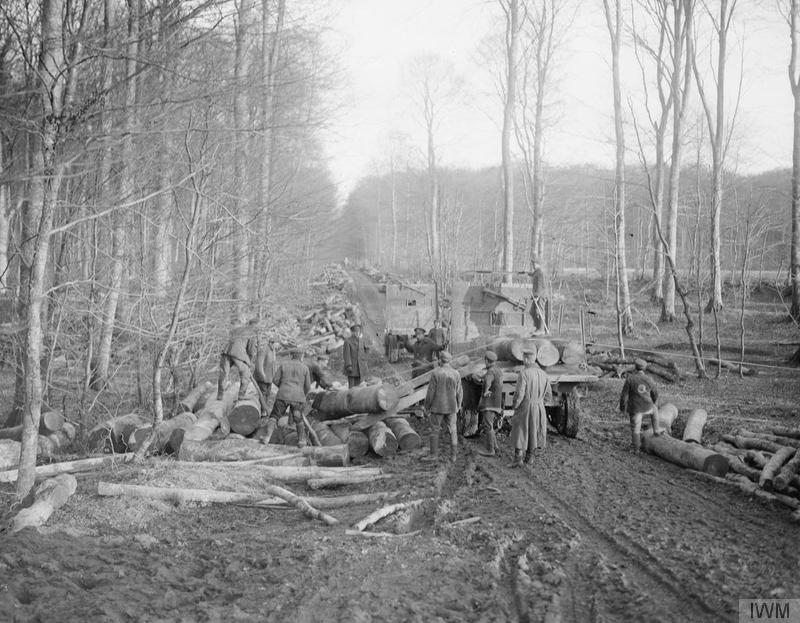
German prisoners of war gathering lumber in 1918

The Eawy Forest is a vestige of the large forests which covered the region in the first millennium AD, but has suffered great clearances. Owned by the Dukes of Normandy, it was seriously damaged during the Hundred Years' War. During World War II, the forest sheltered launching pads for the German V1 rockets targeting London. The forest was further damaged by these military installations and by Allied bombing. The damaged areas were replanted with conifers after the war.

The Eawy forest was long a source of wealth for the inhabitants of the region, providing wood for many sawmills and glassworks. The quality of the oak wood drew many wood workers to settle in the nearby villages, starting in the Middle Ages, making wooden chests. In the 16th century, these wood workers constructed recreational houses for the nobility. The desire for luxury furniture in the Italian style led to a heavy demand for their services.

Nowadays, families use the forest for walks and cycle rides. It is also used for hunting and for wood. It is well stocked with game (hunting), including red deer, wild boar and roe deer.

== Protection ==
A Natura 2000 zone covers a part of the plateau, at the north (Croc massif) and south (Cusson camp) extremities, with an area of 692 ha.

The forests of Eawy and Arques and the Varenne valley are within a zone naturelle d'intérêt écologique, faunistique et floristique.

== Curiosities ==
The forest is crossed by the Allée des Limousins, a straight line for a motorable part of 14 km from Maucomble to Muchedent (Pubel farm). The Saint-Etienne chapel is a chapel of 12m² located in the middle of the wood in the town of Rosay, Seine-Maritime.

The Père Antoine is a hundred year old beech with an exceptional circumference located at Les Grandes-Ventes.

== Bibliography ==
- Guide Bleu Normandie, Hachette, 1988, ISBN 9782010122552
