= Communauté de communes Bray-Eawy =

Federation of municipalities in France

Bray-Eawy
- Communauté de communes
- Interactive map of Bray-Eawy
- Coordinates: 49°44′N 01°27′E
- Country: France
- Region: Normandy
- Department: Seine-Maritime
- No. of communes: {{{nbcomm}}}
- Established: 2017
- Area: 488.4 km^{2} (188.6 sq mi)
- Population (2019): 25,106
  - Density: 51.40/km^{2} (133.1/sq mi)

The Communauté de communes Bray-Eawy is a communauté de communes in the Seine-Maritime département and in the Normandy région of France. It was formed on 1 January 2017 by the merger of the former Communauté de communes du Pays Neufchâtelois, Communauté de communes de Saint-Saëns-Portes de Bray and 8 communes from the former Communauté de communes du Bosc d'Eawy on 1 January 2017. It consists of 46 communes, and its seat is in Neufchâtel-en-Bray. Its area is 488.4 km^{2}, and its population was 25,106 in 2019.

== Composition ==
The communauté de communes consists of the following 46 communes:

1. Ardouval
2. Auvilliers
3. Bellencombre
4. Bosc-Bérenger
5. Bosc-Mesnil
6. Bouelles
7. Bradiancourt
8. Bully
9. Callengeville
10. Critot
11. Esclavelles
12. Fesques
13. Flamets-Frétils
14. Fontaine-en-Bray
15. Fresles
16. Graval
17. La Crique
18. Les Grandes-Ventes
19. Lucy
20. Massy
21. Mathonville
22. Maucomble
23. Ménonval
24. Mesnières-en-Bray
25. Mesnil-Follemprise
26. Montérolier
27. Mortemer
28. Nesle-Hodeng
29. Neufbosc
30. Neufchâtel-en-Bray
31. Neuville-Ferrières
32. Pommeréval
33. Quièvrecourt
34. Rocquemont
35. Rosay
36. Sainte-Beuve-en-Rivière
37. Sainte-Geneviève
38. Saint-Germain-sur-Eaulne
39. Saint-Hellier
40. Saint-Martin-l'Hortier
41. Saint-Martin-Osmonville
42. Saint-Saëns
43. Saint-Saire
44. Sommery
45. Vatierville
46. Ventes-Saint-Rémy
