= Berneuil-en-Bray =

- Commune
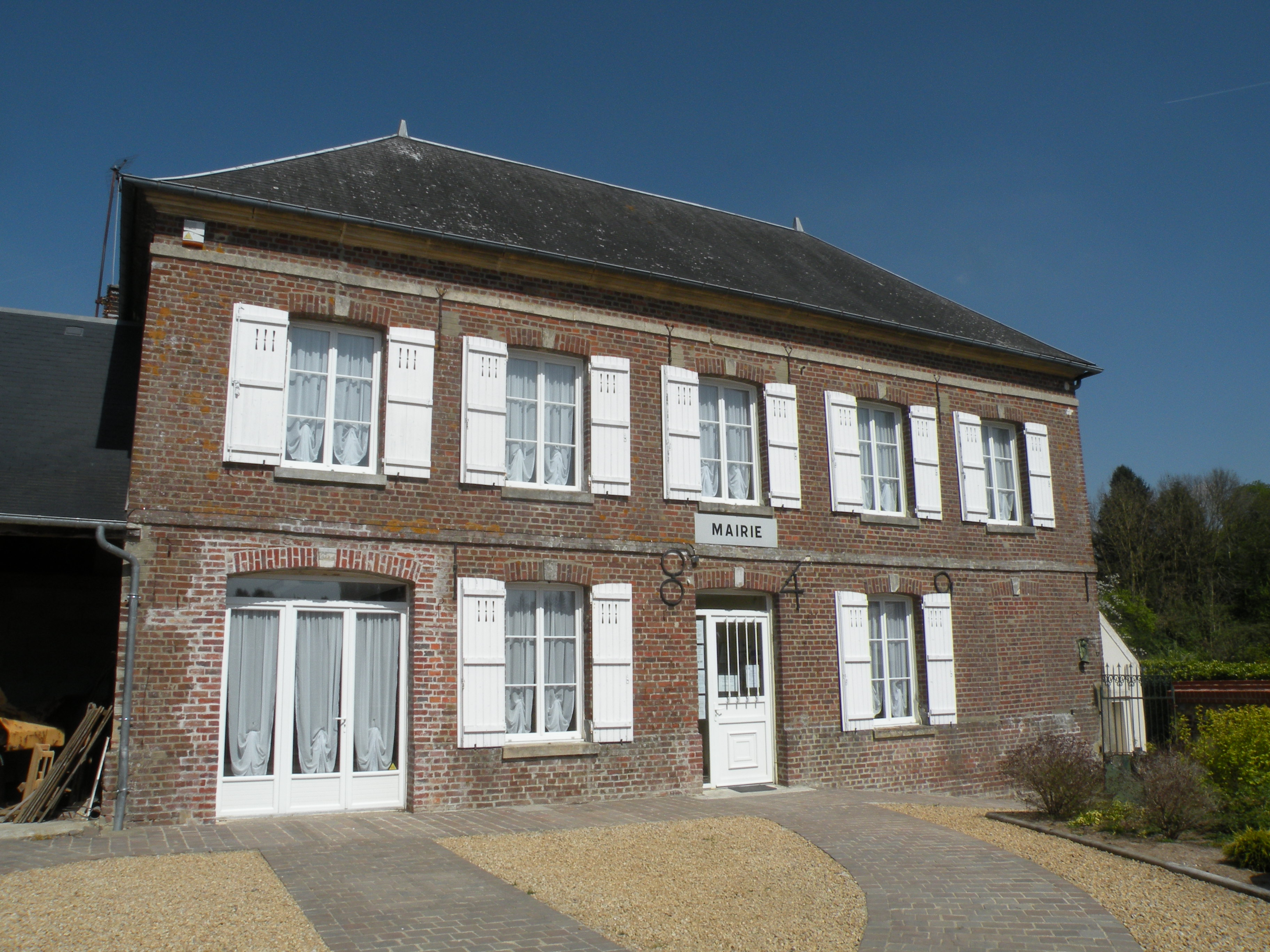
- The town hall in Berneuil-en-Bray
- Location of Berneuil-en-Bray
- Location within France Location within Hauts-de-France
- Coordinates: 49°20′59″N 2°04′00″E
- Country: France
- Region: Hauts-de-France
- Department: Oise
- Arrondissement: Beauvais
- Canton: Beauvais-2
- Intercommunality: CA Beauvaisis

Government
  - Mayor (2023–2026): Jean Louis Vande Burie
- Area^{1}: 15.15 km^{2} (5.85 sq mi)
- Elevation: 128 m (420 ft)
- Highest elevation: 224 m (735 ft)
- Lowest elevation: 88 m (289 ft)
- Population (2023): 813
  - Density: 53.7/km^{2} (139/sq mi)
- Time zone: UTC+01:00 (CET)
  - Summer (DST): UTC+02:00 (CEST)
- INSEE/Postal code: 60063 /60390
- ^{1} French Land Register data, which excludes lakes, ponds, glaciers > 1 km^{2} (0.386 sq mi or 247 acres) and river estuaries.

Berneuil-en-Bray (French pronunciation: [bɛʁnœj ɑ̃ bʁɛ], literally Berneuil in Bray) is a commune in the Oise department in northern France.

== Population ==
Historical population
Year	Pop.	±% p.a.
1968	363	—
1975	385	+0.84%
1982	544	+5.06%
1990	650	+2.25%
1999	756	+1.69%
2007	786	+0.49%
2012	789	+0.08%
2017	788	−0.03%
2023	813	+0.52%
Source: INSEE

== See also ==
- Communes of the Oise department
