= Ardouval =

- Commune
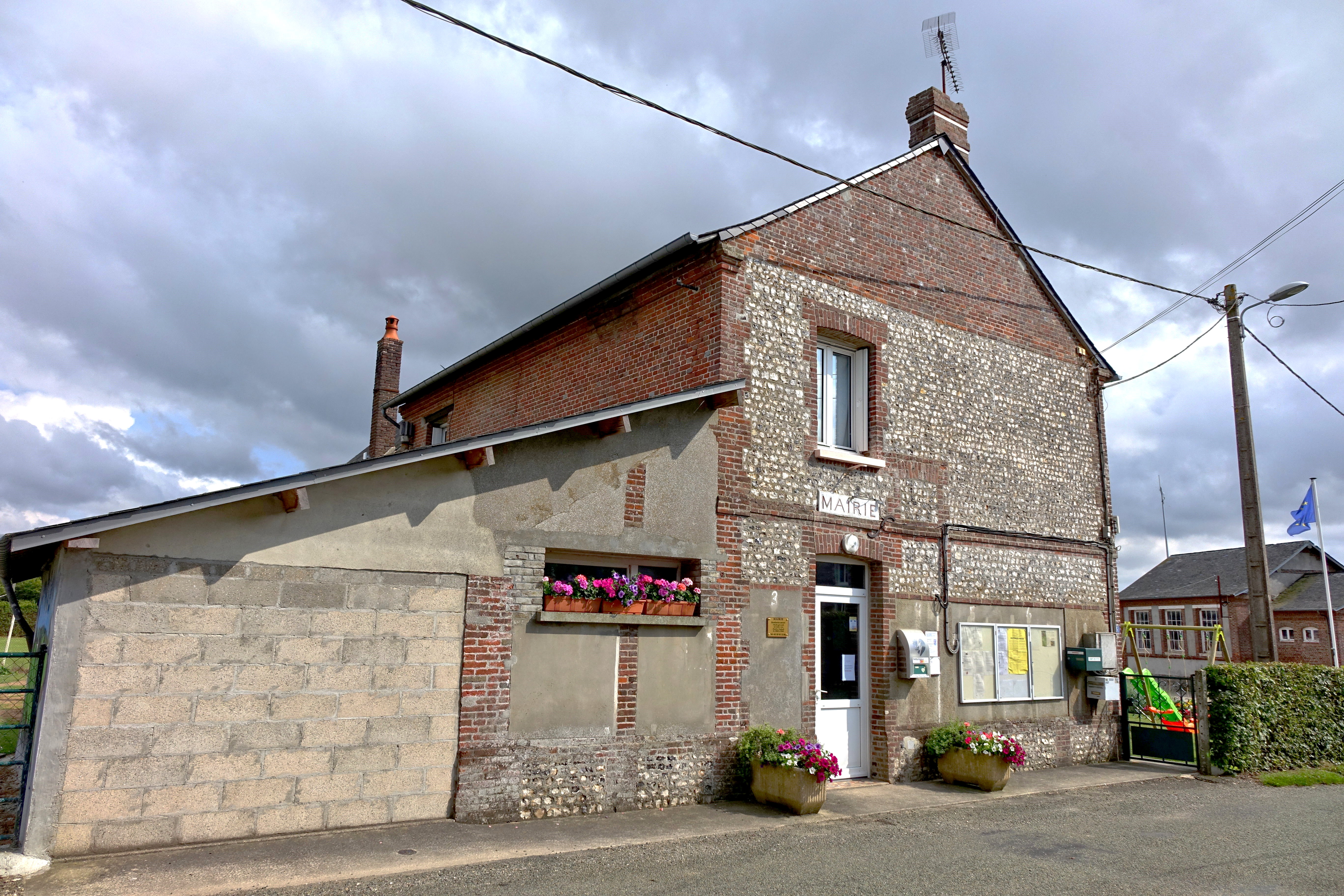
- The town hall in Ardouval
- Location of Ardouval
- Location within France Location within Normandy
- Coordinates: 49°44′49″N 1°16′27″E
- Country: France
- Region: Normandy
- Department: Seine-Maritime
- Arrondissement: Dieppe
- Canton: Neufchâtel-en-Bray
- Intercommunality: CC Bray-Eawy

Government
  - Mayor (2026–32): Laurent Gomes
- Area^{1}: 10.49 km^{2} (4.05 sq mi)
- Elevation: 200 m (660 ft)
- Highest elevation: 211 m (692 ft)
- Lowest elevation: 115 m (377 ft)
- Population (2023): 158
  - Density: 15.1/km^{2} (39.0/sq mi)
- Time zone: UTC+01:00 (CET)
  - Summer (DST): UTC+02:00 (CEST)
- INSEE/Postal code: 76024 /76680
- ^{1} French Land Register data, which excludes lakes, ponds, glaciers > 1 km^{2} (0.386 sq mi or 247 acres) and river estuaries.

Ardouval (French pronunciation: [aʁduval]) is a commune in the Seine-Maritime department in the Normandy region in north-western France.

== Geography ==
A small farming and forestry village in the Pays de Bray, situated some 16 miles (26 km) southeast of Dieppe, at the junction of the D 212 and D 915 roads.

== Population ==
Historical population
Year	Pop.	±% p.a.
1968	212	—
1975	206	−0.41%
1982	200	−0.42%
1990	139	−4.45%
1999	136	−0.24%
2007	169	+2.75%
2012	173	+0.47%
2017	162	−1.31%
2023	158	−0.42%
Source: INSEE

== Places of interest ==
- The church of St.Marguerite, dating from the eighteenth century.
- The château des Hêtres Roux, dating from the eighteenth century
- The forest of Eawy.
- V1 rocket site

== See also ==
- Communes of the Seine-Maritime department
