= Saint-Saëns (disambiguation) =

Saint-Saëns may refer to:

== People ==
- Camille Saint-Saëns (1835–1921), French composer, conductor and musician
- Marc Saint-Saëns (1903–1979), French printmaker

== Places ==
- Saint-Saëns, Seine-Maritime, a commune
- Canton of Saint-Saëns, a former canton in the Seine-Maritime département
- 5210 Saint-Saëns, an asteroid

== See also ==
- Saint Sidonius (Irish saint), Saint Saëns in French, 7th century Irish-born French monk and saint
