= Fresles =

- Commune
- Location of Fresles
- Location within France Location within Normandy
- Coordinates: 49°44′39″N 1°20′56″E
- Country: France
- Region: Normandy
- Department: Seine-Maritime
- Arrondissement: Dieppe
- Canton: Neufchâtel-en-Bray
- Intercommunality: CC Bray-Eawy

Government
  - Mayor (2026–32): Patrick Lévêque
- Area^{1}: 10.96 km^{2} (4.23 sq mi)
- Elevation: 119 m (390 ft)
- Highest elevation: 220 m (720 ft)
- Lowest elevation: 66 m (217 ft)
- Population (2023): 222
  - Density: 20.3/km^{2} (52.5/sq mi)
- Time zone: UTC+01:00 (CET)
  - Summer (DST): UTC+02:00 (CEST)
- INSEE/Postal code: 76283 /76270
- ^{1} French Land Register data, which excludes lakes, ponds, glaciers > 1 km^{2} (0.386 sq mi or 247 acres) and river estuaries.

Fresles (French pronunciation: [fʁɛl]) is a commune in the Seine-Maritime department in the Normandy region in northern France.

== Geography ==
A small farming village situated in the Pays de Bray, some 22 miles (35 km) southeast of Dieppe, at the junction of the D97 and the D114 roads.

== Population ==
Historical population
Year	Pop.	±% p.a.
1968	186	—
1975	173	−1.03%
1982	151	−1.92%
1990	166	+1.19%
1999	147	−1.34%
2007	213	+4.74%
2012	238	+2.24%
2017	236	−0.17%
2023	222	−1.01%
Source: INSEE

== Places of interest ==
- The thirteenth century church of Notre-Dame.

== See also ==
- Communes of the Seine-Maritime department
