= Esclavelles =

- Commune
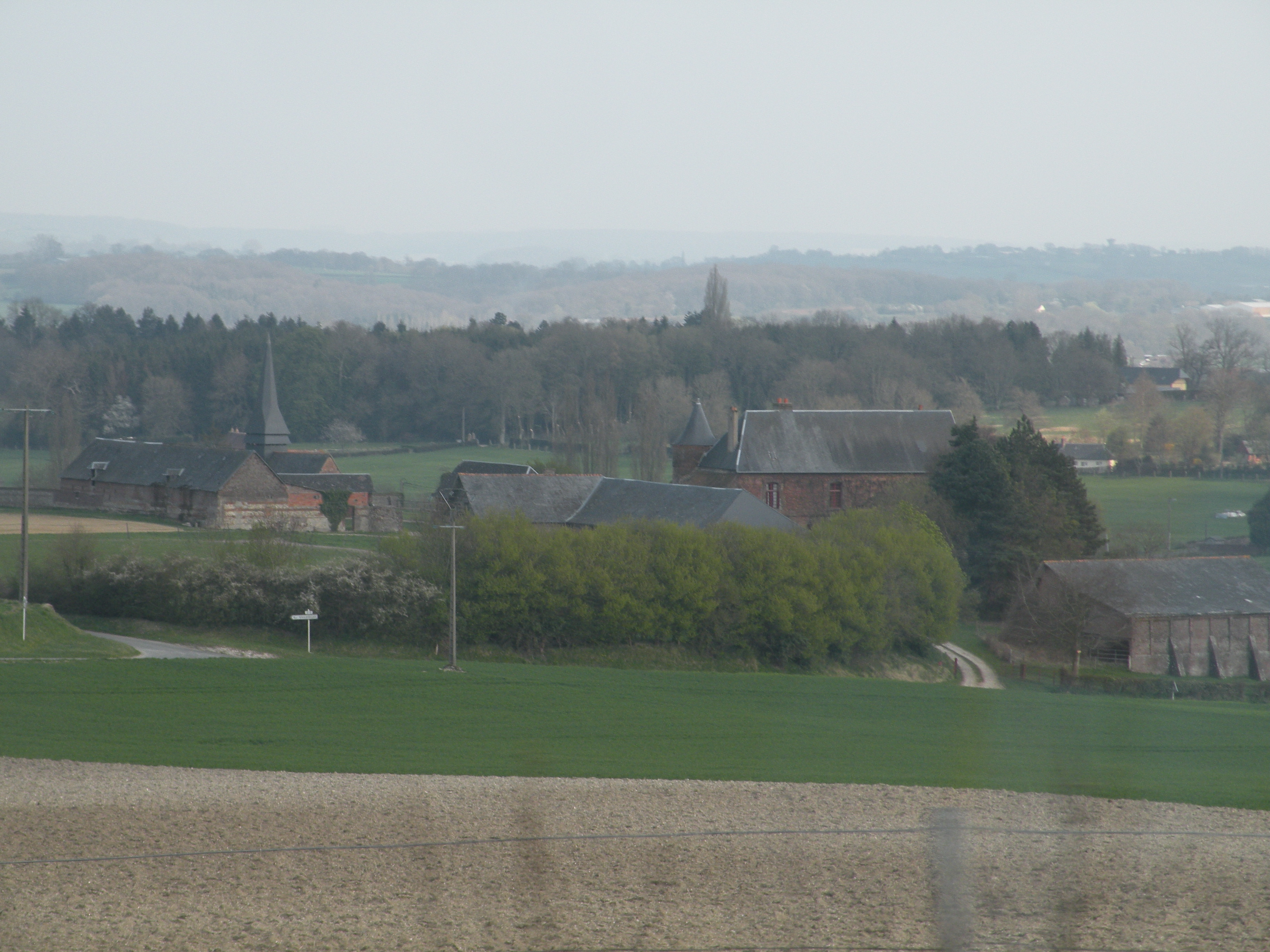
- A general view of Esclavelles

- Coat of arms
- Location of Esclavelles
- Location within France Location within Normandy
- Coordinates: 49°42′28″N 1°23′21″E
- Country: France
- Region: Normandy
- Department: Seine-Maritime
- Arrondissement: Dieppe
- Canton: Neufchâtel-en-Bray
- Intercommunality: CC Bray-Eawy
- Area^{1}: 9.76 km^{2} (3.77 sq mi)
- Elevation: 128 m (420 ft)
- Highest elevation: 236 m (774 ft)
- Lowest elevation: 90 m (300 ft)
- Population (2023): 401
  - Density: 41.1/km^{2} (106/sq mi)
- Time zone: UTC+01:00 (CET)
  - Summer (DST): UTC+02:00 (CEST)
- INSEE/Postal code: 76244 /76270
- ^{1} French Land Register data, which excludes lakes, ponds, glaciers > 1 km^{2} (0.386 sq mi or 247 acres) and river estuaries.

Esclavelles is a commune in the Seine-Maritime department in the Normandy region in northern France.

== Geography ==
A farming village situated in the Pays de Bray, some 23 miles (37 km) southeast of Dieppe, at the junction of the D929 and the D114 roads. Junction 10 of the A28 autoroute lies within the commune's territory.

== Population ==
Historical population
Year	Pop.	±% p.a.
1968	390	—
1975	348	−1.61%
1982	363	+0.60%
1990	328	−1.26%
1999	308	−0.70%
2007	362	+2.04%
2012	378	+0.87%
2017	378	+0.00%
2023	401	+0.99%
Source: INSEE

== Places of interest ==
- An eighteenth-century presbytery.
- The fifteenth-century fortified farmhouse, occupied by the English during the Hundred Years War.
- The church of Notre-Dame, dating from the eleventh century.

== See also ==
- Communes of the Seine-Maritime department
