= Bully, Seine-Maritime =

Bully
- Commune
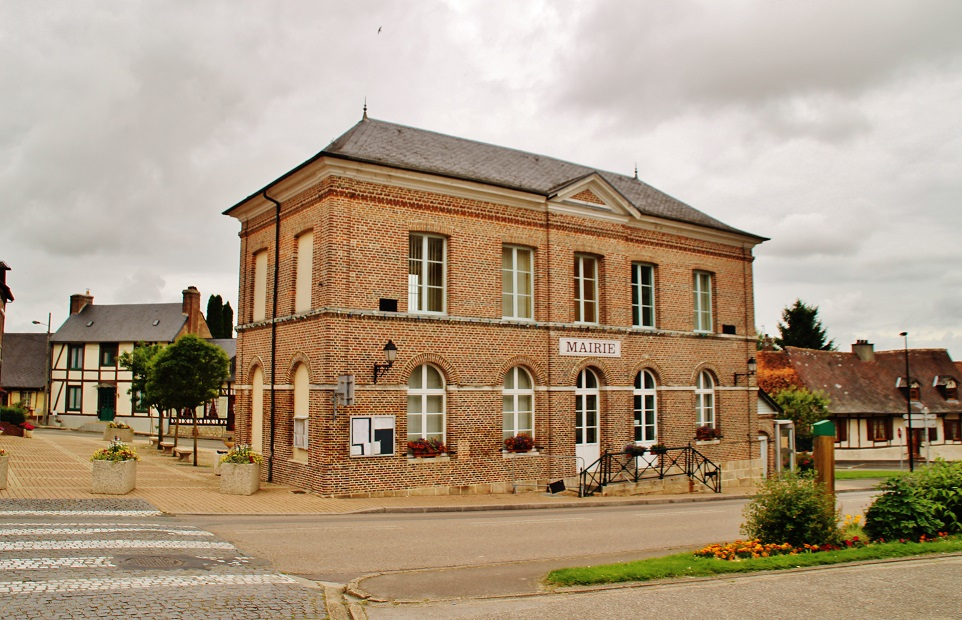
- The town hall in Bully
- Location of Bully
- Location within France Location within Normandy
- Coordinates: 49°43′40″N 1°22′16″E
- Country: France
- Region: Normandy
- Department: Seine-Maritime
- Arrondissement: Dieppe
- Canton: Neufchâtel-en-Bray
- Intercommunality: CC Bray-Eawy

Government
  - Mayor (2026–32): Christian Cossard
- Area^{1}: 19.64 km^{2} (7.58 sq mi)
- Elevation: 110 m (360 ft)
- Highest elevation: 236 m (774 ft)
- Lowest elevation: 76 m (249 ft)
- Population (2023): 863
  - Density: 43.9/km^{2} (114/sq mi)
- Time zone: UTC+01:00 (CET)
  - Summer (DST): UTC+02:00 (CEST)
- INSEE/Postal code: 76147 /76270
- ^{1} French Land Register data, which excludes lakes, ponds, glaciers > 1 km^{2} (0.386 sq mi or 247 acres) and river estuaries.

Bully (French pronunciation: [byli]) is a commune in the Seine-Maritime department in the Normandy region in northern France.

== Geography ==
A farming village situated in the Pays de Bray, 21 miles (34 km) southeast of Dieppe, at the junction of the D48 with the D915 and D114 roads.

== Population ==
Historical population
Year	Pop.	±% p.a.
1968	653	—
1975	610	−0.97%
1982	633	+0.53%
1990	677	+0.84%
1999	792	+1.76%
2007	871	+1.20%
2012	885	+0.32%
2017	916	+0.69%
2023	863	−0.99%
Source: INSEE

== Places of interest ==
- The church of St. Eloi, dating from the thirteenth century.
- The sixteenth century manorhouse du Flot.

== See also ==
- Communes of the Seine-Maritime department
