= Flamets-Frétils =

- Commune
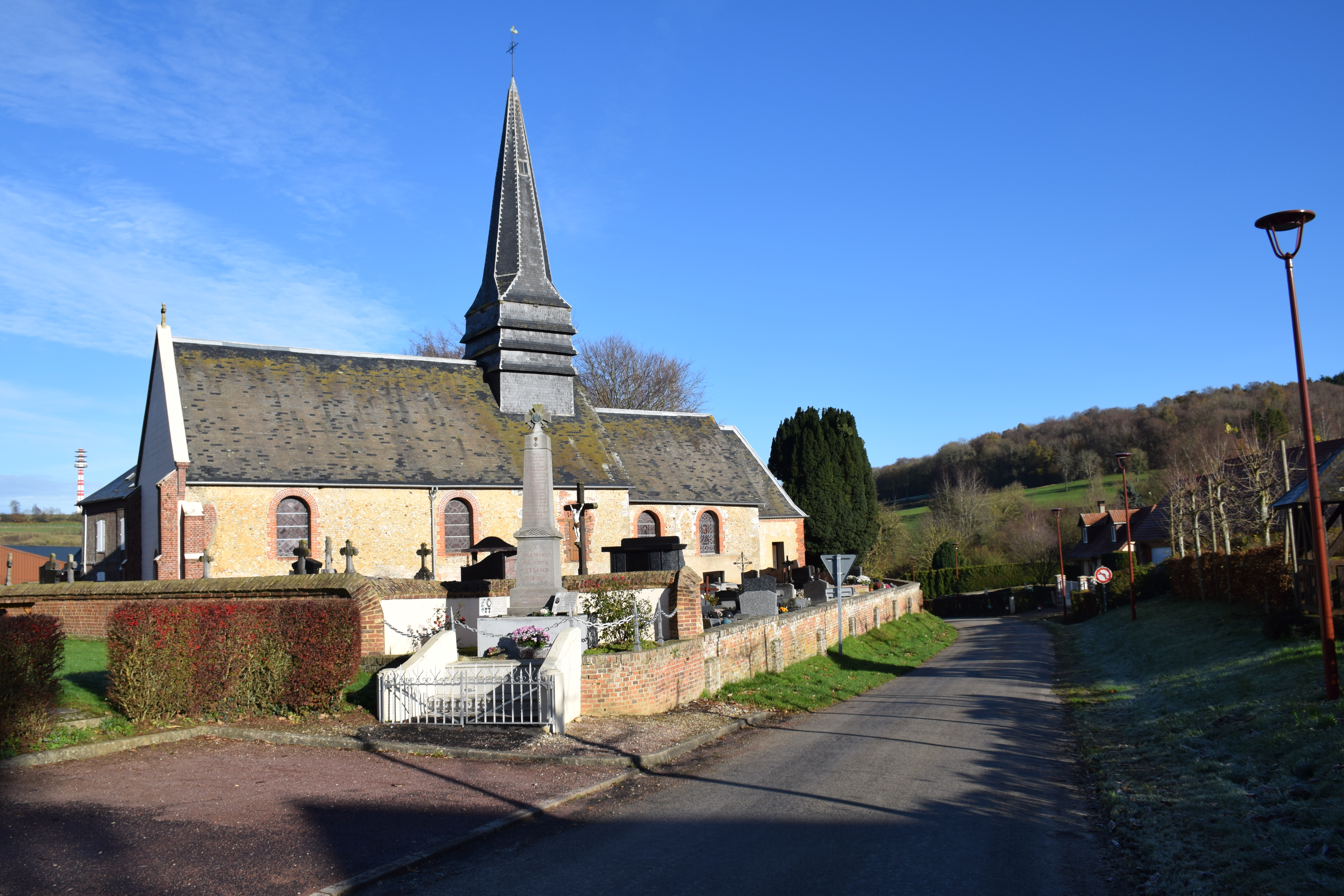
- The church in Flamets-Frétils
- Location of Flamets-Frétils
- Location within France Location within Normandy
- Coordinates: 49°44′01″N 1°34′51″E
- Country: France
- Region: Normandy
- Department: Seine-Maritime
- Arrondissement: Dieppe
- Canton: Neufchâtel-en-Bray
- Intercommunality: CC Bray-Eawy

Government
  - Mayor (2020–2026): Eric Assegond
- Area^{1}: 12.39 km^{2} (4.78 sq mi)
- Elevation: 160 m (520 ft)
- Highest elevation: 242 m (794 ft)
- Lowest elevation: 148 m (486 ft)
- Population (2023): 159
  - Density: 12.8/km^{2} (33.2/sq mi)
- Time zone: UTC+01:00 (CET)
  - Summer (DST): UTC+02:00 (CEST)
- INSEE/Postal code: 76265 /76270
- ^{1} French Land Register data, which excludes lakes, ponds, glaciers > 1 km^{2} (0.386 sq mi or 247 acres) and river estuaries.

Flamets-Frétils is a commune in the Seine-Maritime department in the Normandy region in northern France.

== Geography ==
A small farming village situated in the Pays de Bray, some 32 miles (51 km) southeast of Dieppe, at the junction of the D36 and the D102 roads. The A29 autoroute passes through the commune's territory.

== Population ==
Historical population
Year	Pop.	±% p.a.
1968	269	—
1975	238	−1.73%
1982	233	−0.30%
1990	202	−1.77%
1999	154	−2.97%
2007	165	+0.87%
2012	171	+0.72%
2017	162	−1.08%
2023	159	−0.31%
Source: INSEE

== Places of interest ==
- The chapel of Saint-Laurent at Frétils, dating from the eighteenth century.
- The eighteenth century church of Saint-Valéry at the hamlet of Sausseuzemare.
- The eleventh century chapel of Notre-Dame at the hamlet of Port-Mort.
- The church of St.Pierre at Flaments, dating from the twelfth century.

== See also ==
- Communes of the Seine-Maritime department
