= Fesques =

- Commune
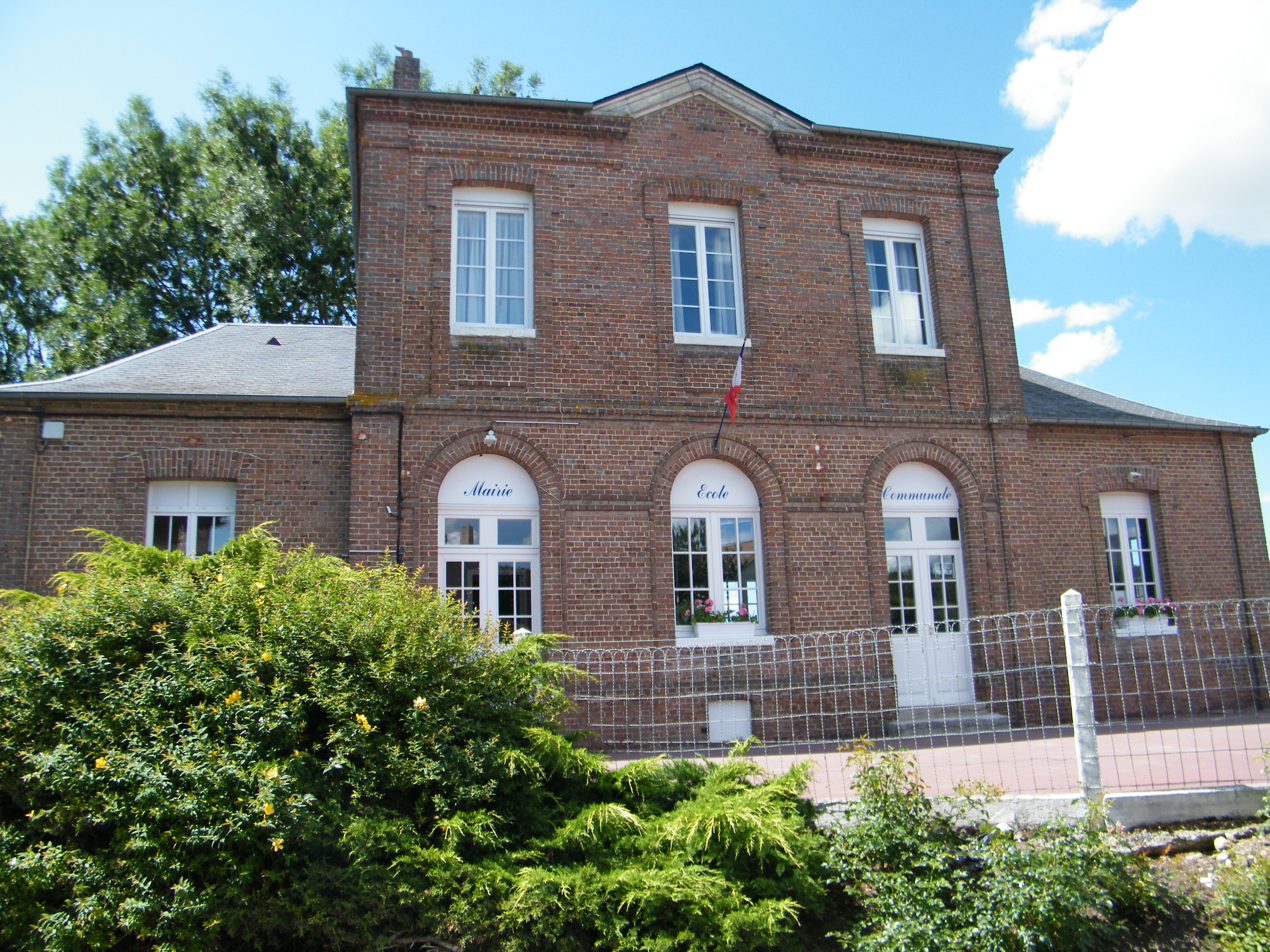
- The town hall and school in Fesques
- Location of Fesques
- Location within France Location within Normandy
- Coordinates: 49°47′26″N 1°28′39″E
- Country: France
- Region: Normandy
- Department: Seine-Maritime
- Arrondissement: Dieppe
- Canton: Neufchâtel-en-Bray
- Intercommunality: CC Bray-Eawy

Government
  - Mayor (2026–32): Guy Lucas
- Area^{1}: 8.8 km^{2} (3.4 sq mi)
- Elevation: 115 m (377 ft)
- Highest elevation: 223 m (732 ft)
- Lowest elevation: 97 m (318 ft)
- Population (2023): 146
  - Density: 17/km^{2} (43/sq mi)
- Time zone: UTC+01:00 (CET)
  - Summer (DST): UTC+02:00 (CEST)
- INSEE/Postal code: 76262 /76270
- ^{1} French Land Register data, which excludes lakes, ponds, glaciers > 1 km^{2} (0.386 sq mi or 247 acres) and river estuaries.

Fesques is a commune in the Seine-Maritime department in the Normandy region in northern France.

== Geography ==
A small farming village situated by the banks of the river Eaulne in the Pays de Bray, some 21 miles (34 km) southeast of Dieppe, at the junction of the D36 and the D928 roads. The A28 autoroute passes through the commune's territory.

== Population ==
Historical population
Year	Pop.	±% p.a.
1968	175	—
1975	150	−2.18%
1982	142	−0.78%
1990	147	+0.43%
1999	127	−1.61%
2007	115	−1.23%
2012	135	+3.26%
2017	119	−2.49%
2023	146	+3.47%
Source: INSEE

== Places of interest ==
- The church of St.Martin, dating from the twelfth century.

== See also ==
- Communes of the Seine-Maritime department
