= Mesnil-Follemprise =

- Commune
- Location of Mesnil-Follemprise
- Location within France Location within Normandy
- Coordinates: 49°46′31″N 1°17′52″E
- Country: France
- Region: Normandy
- Department: Seine-Maritime
- Arrondissement: Dieppe
- Canton: Neufchâtel-en-Bray
- Intercommunality: CC Bray-Eawy

Government
  - Mayor (2020–2026): Eric Battement
- Area^{1}: 7.48 km^{2} (2.89 sq mi)
- Elevation: 120 m (390 ft)
- Highest elevation: 211 m (692 ft)
- Lowest elevation: 103 m (338 ft)
- Population (2023): 119
  - Density: 15.9/km^{2} (41.2/sq mi)
- Time zone: UTC+01:00 (CET)
  - Summer (DST): UTC+02:00 (CEST)
- INSEE/Postal code: 76430 /76660
- ^{1} French Land Register data, which excludes lakes, ponds, glaciers > 1 km^{2} (0.386 sq mi or 247 acres) and river estuaries.

Mesnil-Follemprise is a commune in the Seine-Maritime department in the Normandy region in northern France.

== Geography ==
A small forestry and farming village situated in the Pays de Bray, some 14 miles (23 km) southeast of Dieppe at the junction of the D212 and the D77 roads.

== Population ==
Historical population
Year	Pop.	±% p.a.
1968	214	—
1975	192	−1.54%
1982	170	−1.72%
1990	141	−2.31%
1999	123	−1.51%
2007	125	+0.20%
2012	141	+2.44%
2017	128	−1.92%
2023	119	−1.21%
Source: INSEE

== Places of interest ==
- Several 17th-century manorhouses.
- The church of St.Jean, dating from the seventeenth century.
- The ancient chapel of Notre-Dame.

== See also ==
- Communes of the Seine-Maritime department
