= Lucy, Seine-Maritime =

Lucy
- Commune
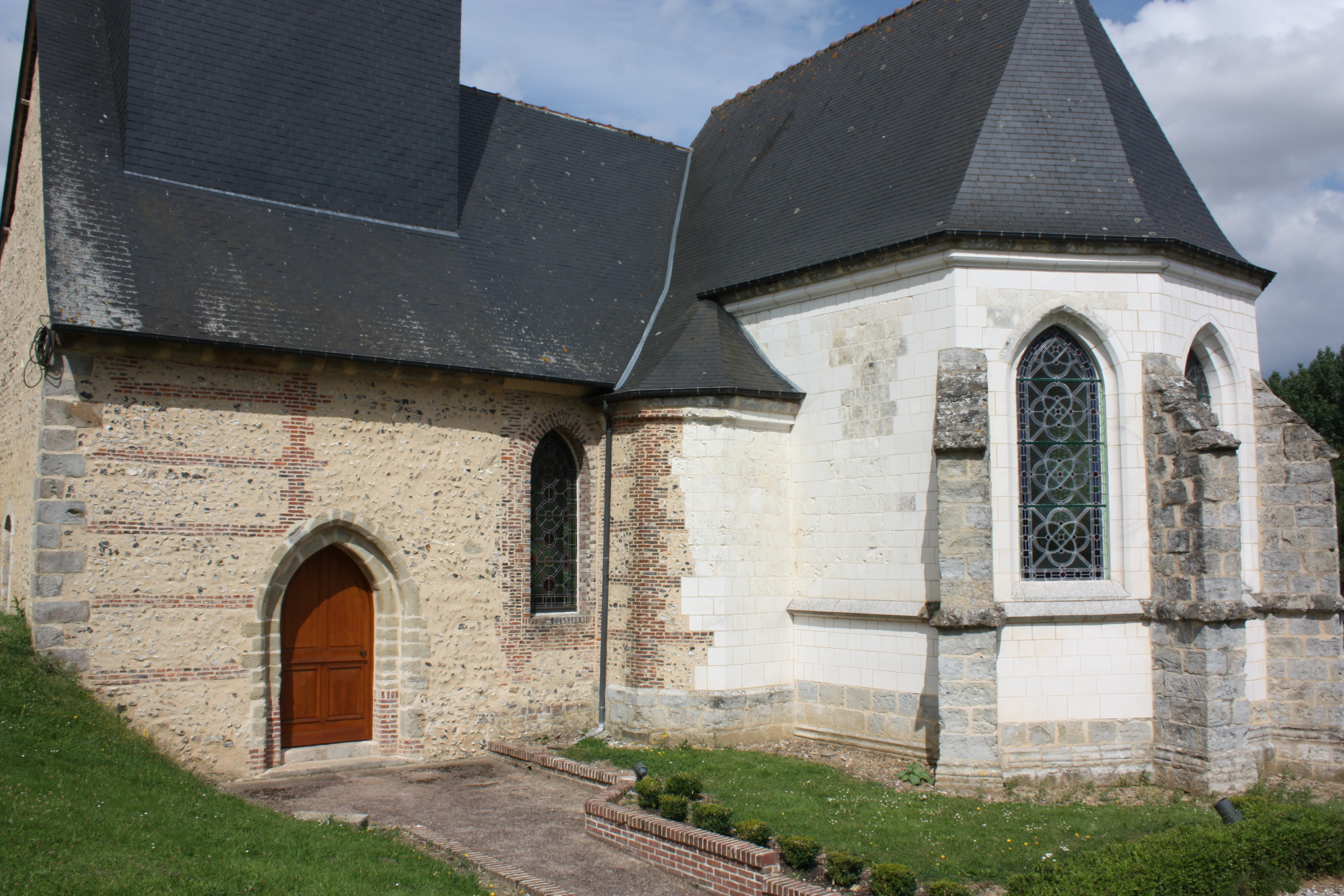
- The church in Lucy
- Location of Lucy
- Location within France Location within Normandy
- Coordinates: 49°46′53″N 1°27′08″E
- Country: France
- Region: Normandy
- Department: Seine-Maritime
- Arrondissement: Dieppe
- Canton: Neufchâtel-en-Bray
- Intercommunality: CC Bray-Eawy

Government
  - Mayor (2026–32): Florence Grognier
- Area^{1}: 9.59 km^{2} (3.70 sq mi)
- Elevation: 225 m (738 ft)
- Highest elevation: 227 m (745 ft)
- Lowest elevation: 96 m (315 ft)
- Population (2023): 180
  - Density: 19/km^{2} (49/sq mi)
- Time zone: UTC+01:00 (CET)
  - Summer (DST): UTC+02:00 (CEST)
- INSEE/Postal code: 76399 /76270
- ^{1} French Land Register data, which excludes lakes, ponds, glaciers > 1 km^{2} (0.386 sq mi or 247 acres) and river estuaries.

Lucy (French pronunciation: [lysi]) is a commune in the Seine-Maritime department in the Normandy region in northern France.

== Geography ==
A small farming village situated by the banks of the river Eaulne in the Pays de Bray, some 21 miles (34 km) southeast of Dieppe at the junction of the D97 with the D1314 road.

== Population ==
Historical population
Year	Pop.	±% p.a.
1968	303	—
1975	247	−2.88%
1982	219	−1.70%
1990	179	−2.49%
1999	144	−2.39%
2007	165	+1.72%
2012	168	+0.36%
2017	189	+2.38%
2023	180	−0.81%
Source: INSEE

== Places of interest ==
- The church of Notre-Dame, dating from the eighteenth century.
- A sixteenth-century chapel.

== See also ==
- Communes of the Seine-Maritime department
