= Quièvrecourt =

- Commune
- Coat of arms
- Location of Quièvrecourt
- Location within France Location within Normandy
- Coordinates: 49°44′04″N 1°25′23″E
- Country: France
- Region: Normandy
- Department: Seine-Maritime
- Arrondissement: Dieppe
- Canton: Neufchâtel-en-Bray
- Intercommunality: CC Bray-Eawy

Government
  - Mayor (2026–32): Joël Boré
- Area^{1}: 4.02 km^{2} (1.55 sq mi)
- Elevation: 120 m (390 ft)
- Highest elevation: 139 m (456 ft)
- Lowest elevation: 69 m (226 ft)
- Population (2023): 396
  - Density: 98.5/km^{2} (255/sq mi)
- Time zone: UTC+01:00 (CET)
  - Summer (DST): UTC+02:00 (CEST)
- INSEE/Postal code: 76516 /76270
- ^{1} French Land Register data, which excludes lakes, ponds, glaciers > 1 km^{2} (0.386 sq mi or 247 acres) and river estuaries.

Quièvrecourt (French pronunciation: [kjɛvʁəkuʁ]) is a commune in the Seine-Maritime department in the Normandy region in north-western France.

== Geography ==
A farming village situated by the banks of the river Béthune in the Pays de Bray at junction 9 of the A28 autoroute with the D 928 road, some 24 miles (39 km) southeast of Dieppe.

== Population ==
Historical population
| Year | Pop. | ±% p.a. |
|---|---|---|
| 1968 | 222 | — |
| 1975 | 296 | +4.20% |
| 1982 | 374 | +3.40% |
| 1990 | 469 | +2.87% |
| 1999 | 419 | −1.24% |
| 2007 | 420 | +0.03% |
| 2012 | 466 | +2.10% |
| 2017 | 448 | −0.78% |
| 2023 | 396 | −2.04% |
Source: INSEE

== Places of interest ==
- The church of St. Ribert, dating from the twelfth century.

== See also ==
- Communes of the Seine-Maritime department
