= Bouelles =

- Commune
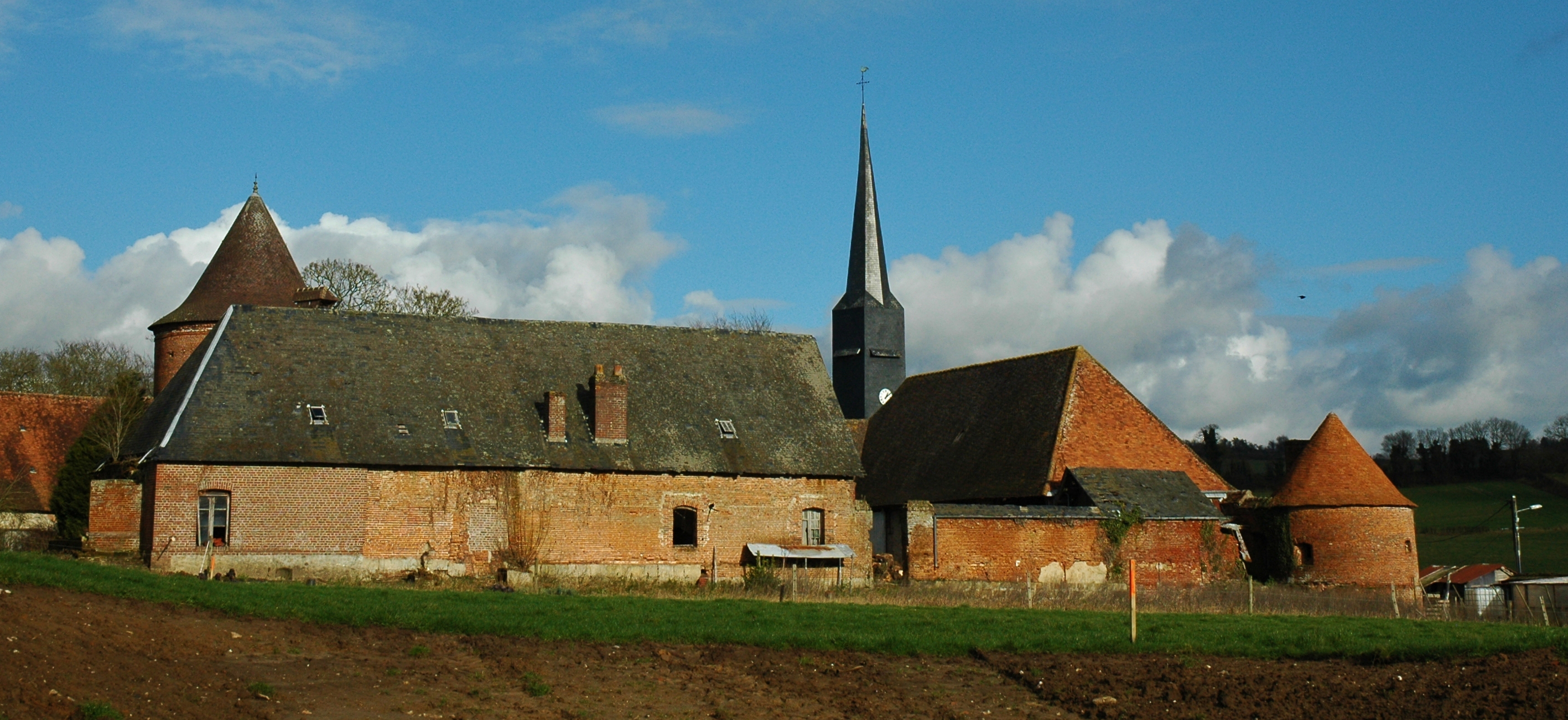
- The chateau and church bell tower in Bouelles
- Location of Bouelles
- Location within France Location within Normandy
- Coordinates: 49°42′51″N 1°29′47″E
- Country: France
- Region: Normandy
- Department: Seine-Maritime
- Arrondissement: Dieppe
- Canton: Neufchâtel-en-Bray
- Intercommunality: CC Bray-Eawy

Government
  - Mayor (2026–32): Gilles Cobert
- Area^{1}: 7.99 km^{2} (3.08 sq mi)
- Elevation: 160 m (520 ft)
- Highest elevation: 234 m (768 ft)
- Lowest elevation: 89 m (292 ft)
- Population (2023): 260
  - Density: 33/km^{2} (84/sq mi)
- Time zone: UTC+01:00 (CET)
  - Summer (DST): UTC+02:00 (CEST)
- INSEE/Postal code: 76130 /76270
- ^{1} French Land Register data, which excludes lakes, ponds, glaciers > 1 km^{2} (0.386 sq mi or 247 acres) and river estuaries.

Bouelles (French pronunciation: [bwɛl]) is a commune in the Seine-Maritime department in the Normandy region in northern France.

== Geography ==
A farming village situated in the valley of the river Béthune in the Pays de Bray, some 20 miles (32 km) southeast of Dieppe, at the junction of the D7 and the D1314 roads.

== Population ==
Historical population
Year	Pop.	±% p.a.
1968	236	—
1975	252	+0.94%
1982	240	−0.69%
1990	240	+0.00%
1999	242	+0.09%
2007	222	−1.07%
2012	279	+4.68%
2017	276	−0.22%
2023	260	−0.99%
Source: INSEE

== Places of interest ==
- The church of St.Martin, dating from the sixteenth century.
- The sixteenth century chateau.
- An ancient stone cross.

== See also ==
- Communes of the Seine-Maritime department
