= Nesle-Hodeng =

- Commune
- Location of Nesle-Hodeng
- Location within France Location within Normandy
- Coordinates: 49°42′24″N 1°30′17″E
- Country: France
- Region: Normandy
- Department: Seine-Maritime
- Arrondissement: Dieppe
- Canton: Neufchâtel-en-Bray
- Intercommunality: CC Bray-Eawy

Government
  - Mayor (2023–2026): Amélie Canac
- Area^{1}: 15.72 km^{2} (6.07 sq mi)
- Elevation: 125 m (410 ft)
- Highest elevation: 244 m (801 ft)
- Lowest elevation: 93 m (305 ft)
- Population (2023): 323
  - Density: 20.5/km^{2} (53.2/sq mi)
- Time zone: UTC+01:00 (CET)
  - Summer (DST): UTC+02:00 (CEST)
- INSEE/Postal code: 76459 /76270
- ^{1} French Land Register data, which excludes lakes, ponds, glaciers > 1 km^{2} (0.386 sq mi or 247 acres) and river estuaries.

Nesle-Hodeng (French pronunciation: [nɛl ɔdɑ̃]) is a commune in the Seine-Maritime department in the Normandy region in north-western France.

== Geography ==
A farming village situated in the valley of the river Béthune in the Pays de Bray, some 25 miles (40 km) southeast of Dieppe at the junction of the D7, the D135 and the D1314.

== Population ==
Historical population
Year	Pop.	±% p.a.
1968	523	—
1975	476	−1.34%
1982	410	−2.11%
1990	360	−1.61%
1999	313	−1.54%
2007	299	−0.57%
2012	340	+2.60%
2017	349	+0.52%
2023	323	−1.28%
Source: INSEE

== Places of interest ==
- The church of St. Pierre, dating from the twelfth century.
- Parts of the 12th-century abbey at Bival, surviving as farm buildings.
- A sixteenth-century stone cross.
- St-Denis’ church at Hodeng.

== See also ==
- Communes of the Seine-Maritime department
