= Vatierville =

- Commune
- Location of Vatierville
- Location within France Location within Normandy
- Coordinates: 49°47′31″N 1°31′24″E
- Country: France
- Region: Normandy
- Department: Seine-Maritime
- Arrondissement: Dieppe
- Canton: Neufchâtel-en-Bray
- Intercommunality: CC Bray-Eawy

Government
  - Mayor (2026–32): Jacques Berthe
- Area^{1}: 4.52 km^{2} (1.75 sq mi)
- Elevation: 114 m (374 ft)
- Highest elevation: 237 m (778 ft)
- Lowest elevation: 105 m (344 ft)
- Population (2023): 130
  - Density: 29/km^{2} (74/sq mi)
- Time zone: UTC+01:00 (CET)
  - Summer (DST): UTC+02:00 (CEST)
- INSEE/Postal code: 76724 /76270
- ^{1} French Land Register data, which excludes lakes, ponds, glaciers > 1 km^{2} (0.386 sq mi or 247 acres) and river estuaries.

Vatierville is a commune in the Seine-Maritime department in the Normandy region in northern France.

== Geography ==
A small farming village situated by the banks of the river Eaulne in the Pays de Bray, some 19 miles (31 km) southeast of Dieppe at the junction of the D928 and the D36.

== Population ==
Historical population
Year	Pop.	±% p.a.
1968	128	—
1975	128	+0.00%
1982	112	−1.89%
1990	95	−2.04%
1999	105	+1.12%
2007	107	+0.24%
2012	126	+3.32%
2017	133	+1.09%
2023	130	−0.38%
Source: INSEE

== Places of interest ==
- The church of St. Pierre, dating from the sixteenth century.

== See also ==
- Communes of the Seine-Maritime department
