= Graval =

- Commune
- Location of Graval
- Location within France Location within Normandy
- Coordinates: 49°43′41″N 1°32′32″E
- Country: France
- Region: Normandy
- Department: Seine-Maritime
- Arrondissement: Dieppe
- Canton: Neufchâtel-en-Bray
- Intercommunality: CC Bray-Eawy

Government
  - Mayor (2026–32): Xavier Bourguignon
- Area^{1}: 3.95 km^{2} (1.53 sq mi)
- Elevation: 216 m (709 ft)
- Highest elevation: 236 m (774 ft)
- Lowest elevation: 145 m (476 ft)
- Population (2023): 153
  - Density: 38.7/km^{2} (100/sq mi)
- Time zone: UTC+01:00 (CET)
  - Summer (DST): UTC+02:00 (CEST)
- INSEE/Postal code: 76323 /76270
- ^{1} French Land Register data, which excludes lakes, ponds, glaciers > 1 km^{2} (0.386 sq mi or 247 acres) and river estuaries.

Graval (French pronunciation: [ɡʁaval]) is a commune in the Seine-Maritime department in the Normandy region in north-western France.

== Geography ==
A small farming village situated in the Pays de Bray, some 26 miles (42 km) southeast of Dieppe, on the D7 road near junction 11 of the A29 autoroute.

== Population ==
Historical population
Year	Pop.	±% p.a.
1968	130	—
1975	101	−3.54%
1982	105	+0.56%
1990	104	−0.12%
1999	100	−0.43%
2007	114	+1.65%
2012	159	+6.88%
2017	155	−0.51%
2023	153	−0.22%
Source: INSEE

== Places of interest ==
- The church of St.Pierre, dating from the eighteenth century.

== See also ==
- Communes of the Seine-Maritime department
