= Callengeville =

- Commune
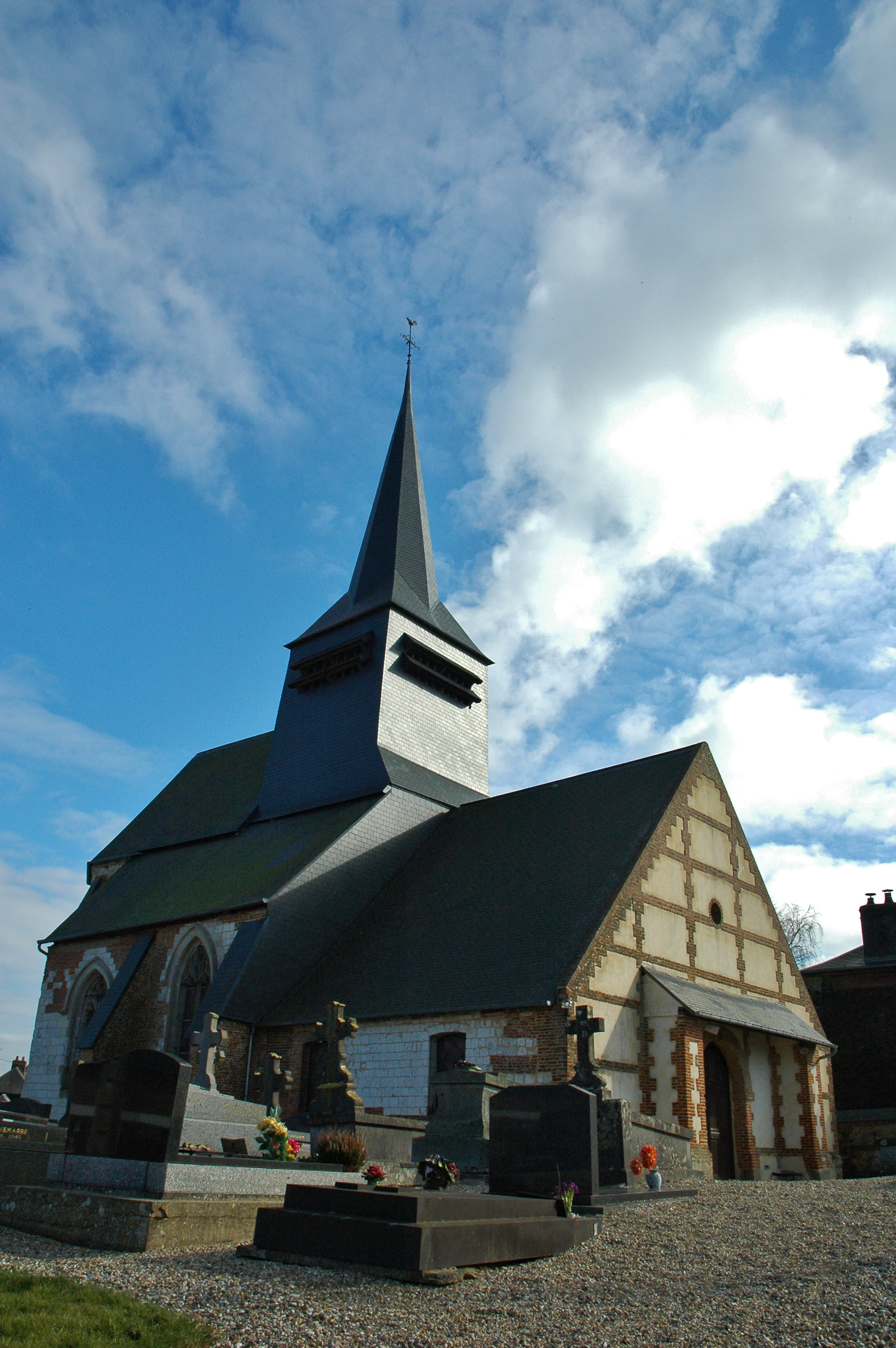
- The church in Callengeville
- Location of Callengeville
- Location within France Location within Normandy
- Coordinates: 49°48′40″N 1°31′15″E
- Country: France
- Region: Normandy
- Department: Seine-Maritime
- Arrondissement: Dieppe
- Canton: Neufchâtel-en-Bray
- Intercommunality: CC Bray-Eawy

Government
  - Mayor (2020–2026): Philippe Peltier
- Area^{1}: 17.13 km^{2} (6.61 sq mi)
- Elevation: 209 m (686 ft)
- Highest elevation: 231 m (758 ft)
- Lowest elevation: 154 m (505 ft)
- Population (2023): 499
  - Density: 29.1/km^{2} (75.4/sq mi)
- Time zone: UTC+01:00 (CET)
  - Summer (DST): UTC+02:00 (CEST)
- INSEE/Postal code: 76122 /76270
- ^{1} French Land Register data, which excludes lakes, ponds, glaciers > 1 km^{2} (0.386 sq mi or 247 acres) and river estuaries.

Callengeville (French pronunciation: [kalɑ̃ʒvil]) is a commune in the Seine-Maritime department in the Normandy region in northern France. It was formed in 1973 by the merger of the former communes Bosc-Geffroy and Les Essarts-Varimpré.

== Geography ==
A forestry and farming village situated in the Pays de Bray, some 19 miles (31 km) southeast of Dieppe, at junction 6 of the A28 autoroute with the D928 road.

== Population ==
Historical population
Year	Pop.	±% p.a.
1968	510	—
1975	462	−1.40%
1982	466	+0.12%
1990	491	+0.66%
1999	455	−0.84%
2007	472	+0.46%
2012	516	+1.80%
2017	511	−0.19%
2023	499	−0.40%
Source: INSEE

== Places of interest ==
- The church of St.Laurent, dating from the sixteenth century.
- The church of St.Mathurin, dating from the eighteenth century.

== See also ==
- Communes of the Seine-Maritime department
