= Neuville-Ferrières =

- Commune
- Coat of arms
- Location of Neuville-Ferrières
- Location within France Location within Normandy
- Coordinates: 49°42′44″N 1°27′31″E
- Country: France
- Region: Normandy
- Department: Seine-Maritime
- Arrondissement: Dieppe
- Canton: Neufchâtel-en-Bray
- Intercommunality: CC Bray-Eawy

Government
  - Mayor (2026–32): Hervé Guerard
- Area^{1}: 13.02 km^{2} (5.03 sq mi)
- Elevation: 100 m (330 ft)
- Highest elevation: 229 m (751 ft)
- Lowest elevation: 80 m (260 ft)
- Population (2023): 528
  - Density: 40.6/km^{2} (105/sq mi)
- Time zone: UTC+01:00 (CET)
  - Summer (DST): UTC+02:00 (CEST)
- INSEE/Postal code: 76465 /76270
- ^{1} French Land Register data, which excludes lakes, ponds, glaciers > 1 km^{2} (0.386 sq mi or 247 acres) and river estuaries.

Neuville-Ferrières (French pronunciation: [nøvil fɛʁjɛʁ]) is a commune in the Seine-Maritime department in the Normandy region in northern France.

== Geography ==
A farming village situated in the Pays de Bray, by the banks of the river Béthune at the point where it's bridged by the D117 road, some 28 miles (45 km) southeast of Dieppe .

== Population ==
Historical population
Year	Pop.	±% p.a.
1968	510	—
1975	459	−1.49%
1982	536	+2.24%
1990	544	+0.19%
1999	578	+0.68%
2007	595	+0.36%
2012	589	−0.20%
2017	579	−0.34%
2023	528	−1.53%
Source: INSEE

== Places of interest ==
- The church of Notre-Dame, dating from the thirteenth century.
- The ruins of a 13th-century feudal castle.
- The presbytery, dating from the thirteenth century.
- A sixteenth-century manorhouse.

== See also ==
- Communes of the Seine-Maritime department
