= Ménonval =

- Commune
- Location of Ménonval
- Location within France Location within Normandy
- Coordinates: 49°46′22″N 1°29′37″E
- Country: France
- Region: Normandy
- Department: Seine-Maritime
- Arrondissement: Dieppe
- Canton: Neufchâtel-en-Bray
- Intercommunality: CC Bray-Eawy

Government
  - Mayor (2026–32): Michel Dehédin
- Area^{1}: 5.32 km^{2} (2.05 sq mi)
- Elevation: 127 m (417 ft)
- Highest elevation: 229 m (751 ft)
- Lowest elevation: 105 m (344 ft)
- Population (2023): 236
  - Density: 44.4/km^{2} (115/sq mi)
- Time zone: UTC+01:00 (CET)
  - Summer (DST): UTC+02:00 (CEST)
- INSEE/Postal code: 76424 /76270
- ^{1} French Land Register data, which excludes lakes, ponds, glaciers > 1 km^{2} (0.386 sq mi or 247 acres) and river estuaries.

Ménonval (French pronunciation: [menɔ̃val]) is a commune in the Seine-Maritime department in the Normandy region in northern France.

== Geography ==
A small farming village situated by the banks of the river Eaulne in the Pays de Bray, some 21 miles (34 km) southeast of Dieppe at the junction of the D928 with two motorways at junction 7 of the A28 autoroute and the A29 autoroute.

== Population ==
Historical population
Year	Pop.	±% p.a.
1968	193	—
1975	164	−2.30%
1982	159	−0.44%
1990	173	+1.06%
1999	174	+0.06%
2007	192	+1.24%
2012	201	+0.92%
2017	221	+1.92%
2023	236	+1.10%
Source: INSEE

== Places of interest ==
- The church of St.Nicolas, dating from the thirteenth century.
- Traces of a feudal castle.

== See also ==
- Communes of the Seine-Maritime department
