= Grigneuseville =

- Commune
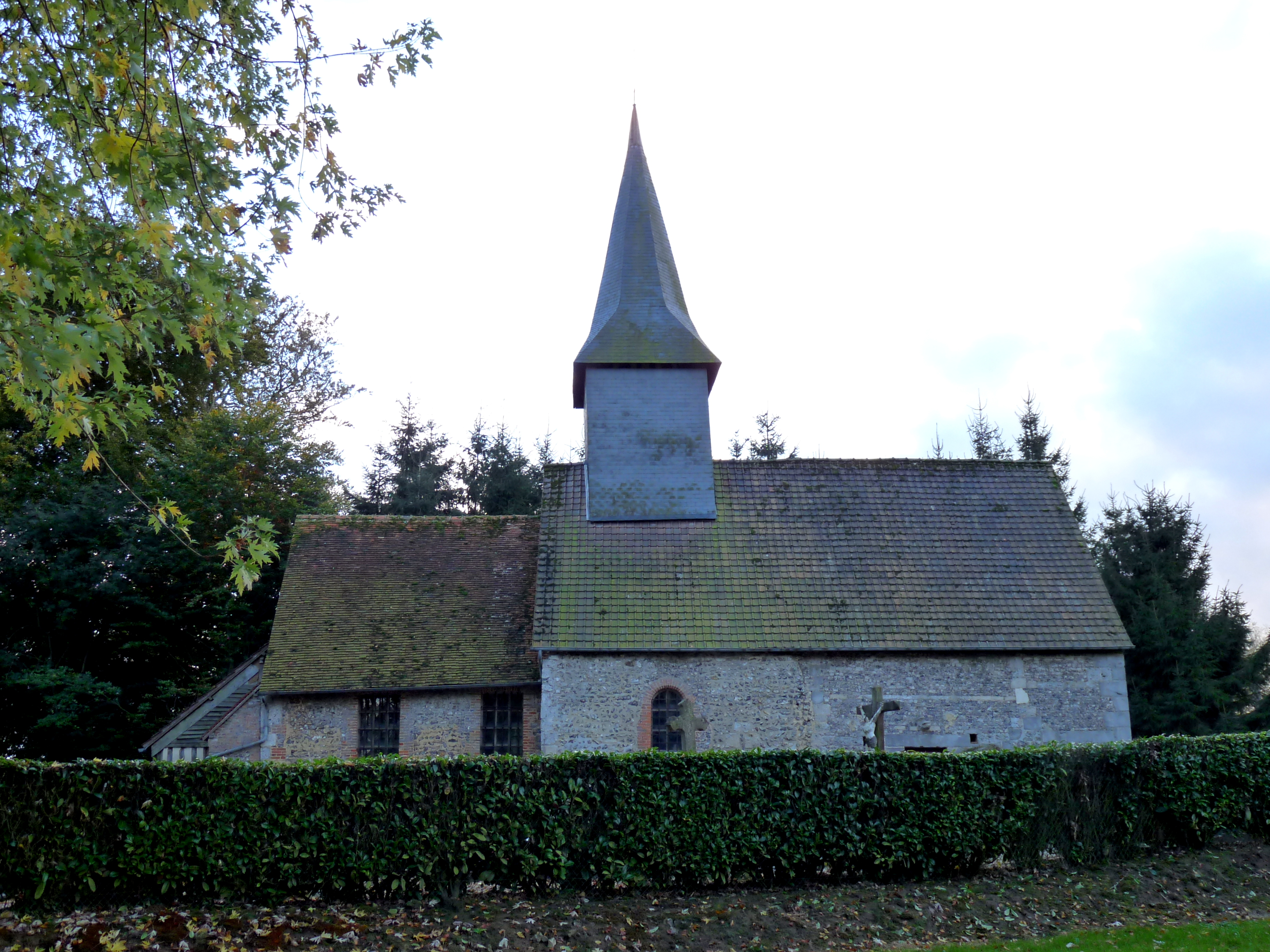
- The chapel of Louvetot, in Grigneuseville
- Location of Grigneuseville
- Location within France Location within Normandy
- Coordinates: 49°39′16″N 1°11′25″E
- Country: France
- Region: Normandy
- Department: Seine-Maritime
- Arrondissement: Rouen
- Canton: Neufchâtel-en-Bray
- Intercommunality: Inter-Caux-Vexin

Government
  - Mayor (2026–32): Philippe Vallée
- Area^{1}: 7.59 km^{2} (2.93 sq mi)
- Elevation: 165 m (541 ft)
- Highest elevation: 172 m (564 ft)
- Lowest elevation: 148 m (486 ft)
- Population (2023): 371
  - Density: 48.9/km^{2} (127/sq mi)
- Time zone: UTC+01:00 (CET)
  - Summer (DST): UTC+02:00 (CEST)
- INSEE/Postal code: 76328 /76850
- ^{1} French Land Register data, which excludes lakes, ponds, glaciers > 1 km^{2} (0.386 sq mi or 247 acres) and river estuaries.

Grigneuseville (French pronunciation: [ɡʁiɲøzvil]) is a commune in the Seine-Maritime department in the Normandy region in northern France.

== Geography ==
A farming village situated in the Pays de Caux, some 24 miles (39 km) south of Dieppe at the junction of the D225, D96 and D151 roads. The A29 autoroute passes through the territory of the commune.

== Population ==
Historical population
Year	Pop.	±% p.a.
1968	217	—
1975	183	−2.41%
1982	206	+1.71%
1990	308	+5.16%
1999	327	+0.67%
2007	318	−0.35%
2012	334	+0.99%
2017	368	+1.96%
2023	371	+0.14%
Source: INSEE

== Places of interest ==
- The church of St.Pierre, dating from the sixteenth century.
- The thirteenth century chapel of St.Madeleine.
- The château d'Haucourt.

== See also ==
- Communes of the Seine-Maritime department
