= La Crique =

- Commune
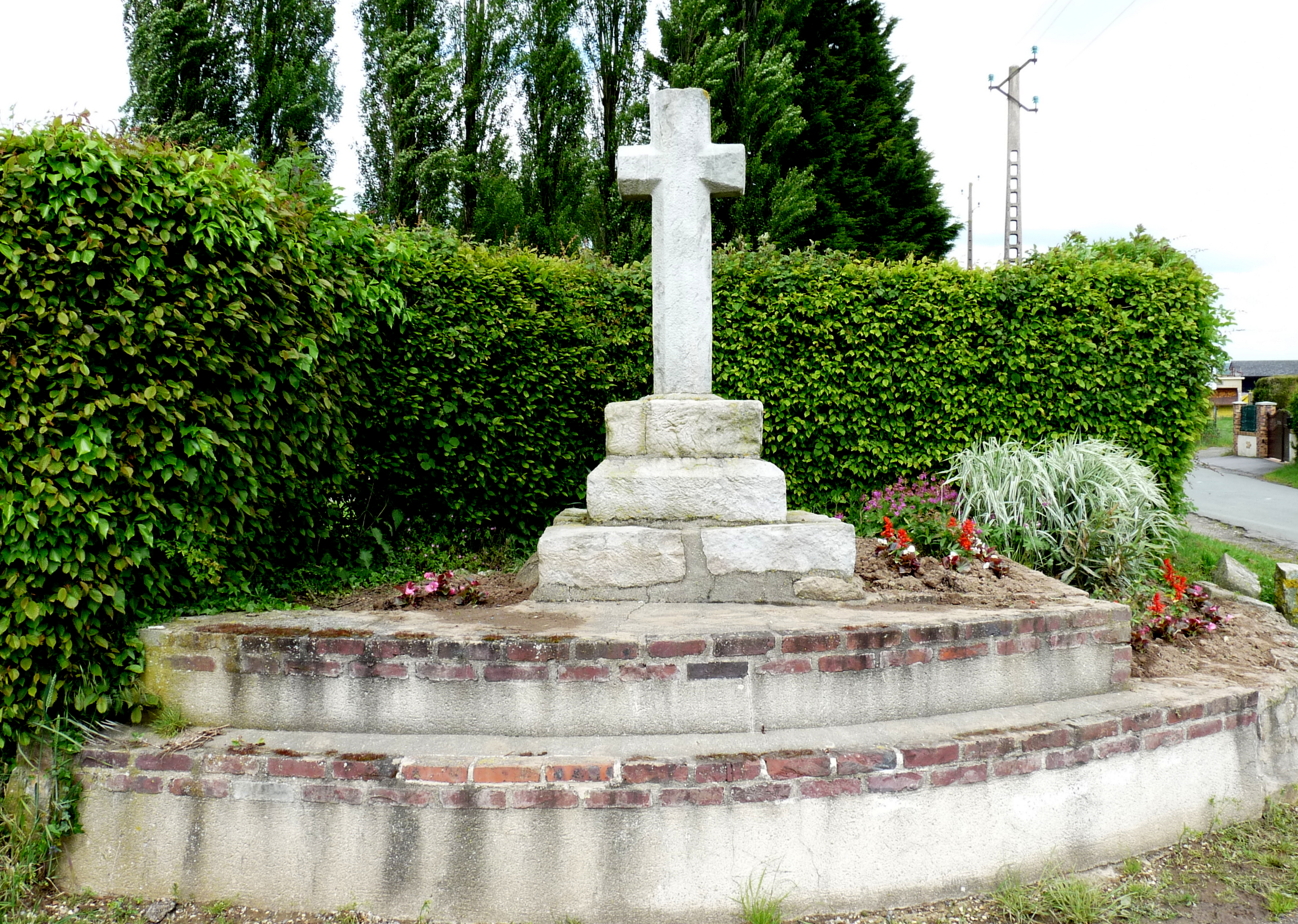
- The cross at the crossroads in La Crique
- Location of La Crique
- Location within France Location within Normandy
- Coordinates: 49°41′29″N 1°11′54″E
- Country: France
- Region: Normandy
- Department: Seine-Maritime
- Arrondissement: Dieppe
- Canton: Neufchâtel-en-Bray
- Intercommunality: CC Bray-Eawy

Government
  - Mayor (2026–32): Jacques Vacher
- Area^{1}: 10.18 km^{2} (3.93 sq mi)
- Elevation: 160 m (520 ft)
- Highest elevation: 174 m (571 ft)
- Lowest elevation: 90 m (300 ft)
- Population (2023): 383
  - Density: 37.6/km^{2} (97.4/sq mi)
- Time zone: UTC+01:00 (CET)
  - Summer (DST): UTC+02:00 (CEST)
- INSEE/Postal code: 76193 /76850
- ^{1} French Land Register data, which excludes lakes, ponds, glaciers > 1 km^{2} (0.386 sq mi or 247 acres) and river estuaries.

La Crique (French pronunciation: [la kʁik]) is a commune in the Seine-Maritime department in the Normandy region in northern France.

== Geography ==
A farming village situated in the Pays de Caux, some 20 miles (32 km) south of Dieppe at the junction of the D115, the D99 and the D15 roads.

== Population ==
Historical population
Year	Pop.	±% p.a.
1968	262	—
1975	247	−0.84%
1982	261	+0.79%
1990	273	+0.56%
1999	288	+0.60%
2007	352	+2.54%
2012	358	+0.34%
2017	350	−0.45%
2023	383	+1.51%
Source: INSEE

== Places of interest ==
- A sixteenth-century stone cross at the crossroads.
- The nineteenth-century chapel of Notre-Dame.
- Trinity church dating from the nineteenth century.
- The sixteenth-century church of the Innocents.

== See also ==
- Communes of the Seine-Maritime department
