= Fontaine-en-Bray =

- Commune
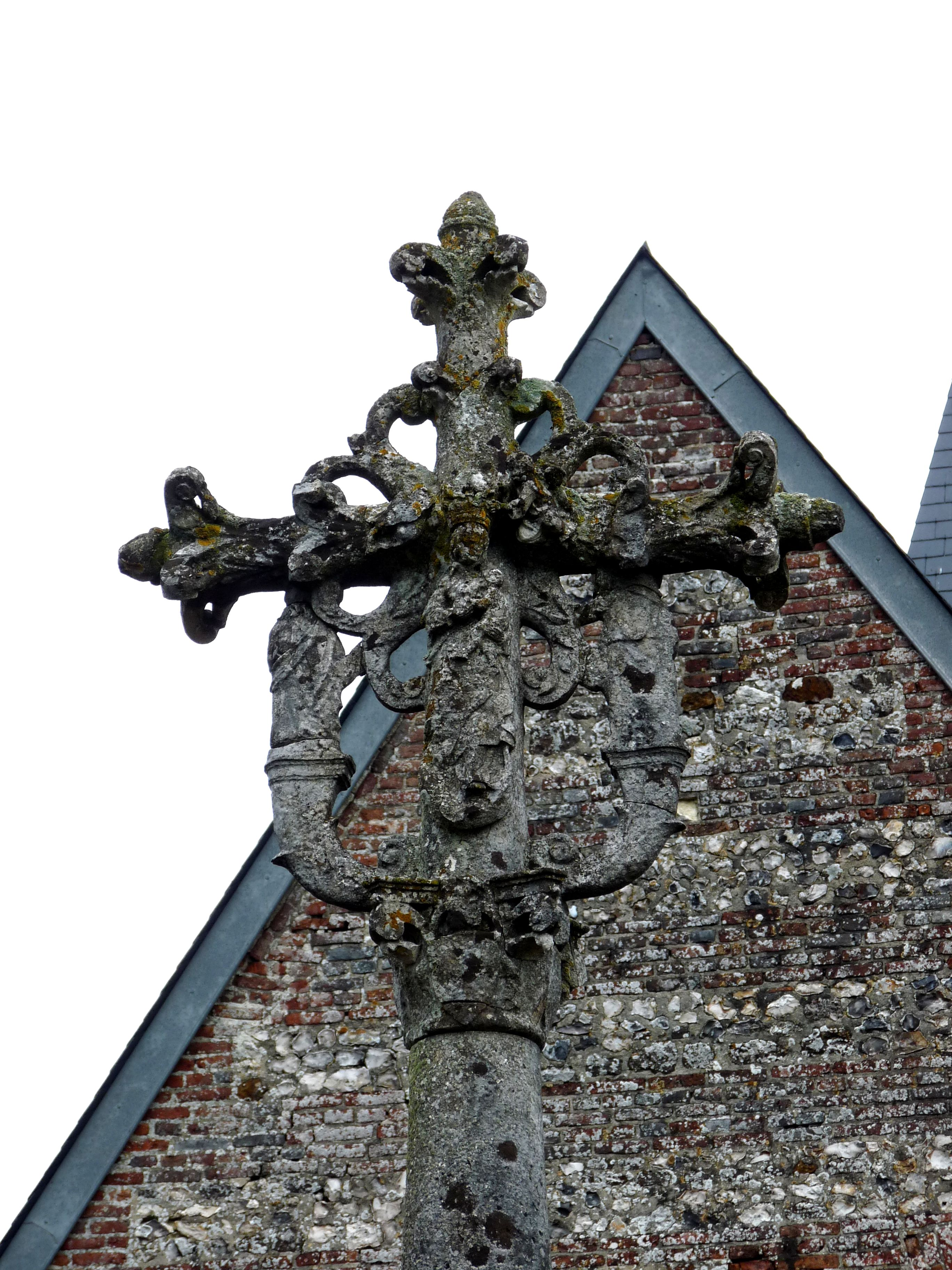
- A cross on the church
- Location of Fontaine-en-Bray
- Location within France Location within Normandy
- Coordinates: 49°40′34″N 1°25′39″E
- Country: France
- Region: Normandy
- Department: Seine-Maritime
- Arrondissement: Dieppe
- Canton: Neufchâtel-en-Bray
- Intercommunality: CC Bray-Eawy

Government
  - Mayor (2026–32): Fouad Nammour
- Area^{1}: 6.03 km^{2} (2.33 sq mi)
- Elevation: 132 m (433 ft)
- Highest elevation: 233 m (764 ft)
- Lowest elevation: 100 m (330 ft)
- Population (2023): 165
  - Density: 27.4/km^{2} (70.9/sq mi)
- Time zone: UTC+01:00 (CET)
  - Summer (DST): UTC+02:00 (CEST)
- INSEE/Postal code: 76269 /76440
- ^{1} French Land Register data, which excludes lakes, ponds, glaciers > 1 km^{2} (0.386 sq mi or 247 acres) and river estuaries.

Fontaine-en-Bray (French pronunciation: [fɔ̃tɛn ɑ̃ bʁɛ], literally Fontaine in Bray) is a commune in the Seine-Maritime department in the Normandy region in northern France.

== Geography ==
A small farming village situated in the Pays de Bray, some 33 miles (53 km) southeast of Dieppe, at the junction of the D1, the D114 and the D119 roads.

== Population ==
Historical population
Year	Pop.	±% p.a.
1968	204	—
1975	161	−3.33%
1982	140	−1.98%
1990	164	+2.00%
1999	170	+0.40%
2007	160	−0.75%
2012	163	+0.37%
2017	176	+1.55%
2023	165	−1.07%
Source: INSEE

== Places of interest ==
- The eleventh-century church of Saint-Sulpice.
- A sixteenth-century stone cross.

== See also ==
- Communes of the Seine-Maritime department
