= Beaumont-le-Hareng =

- Commune
- Coat of arms
- Location of Beaumont-le-Hareng
- Location within France Location within Normandy
- Coordinates: 49°40′15″N 1°13′23″E
- Country: France
- Region: Normandy
- Department: Seine-Maritime
- Arrondissement: Rouen
- Canton: Neufchâtel-en-Bray
- Intercommunality: Inter-Caux-Vexin

Government
  - Mayor (2026–32): Béatrice Fourneaux
- Area^{1}: 5.74 km^{2} (2.22 sq mi)
- Elevation: 169 m (554 ft)
- Highest elevation: 169 m (554 ft)
- Lowest elevation: 100 m (330 ft)
- Population (2023): 256
  - Density: 44.6/km^{2} (116/sq mi)
- Time zone: UTC+01:00 (CET)
  - Summer (DST): UTC+02:00 (CEST)
- INSEE/Postal code: 76062 /76850
- ^{1} French Land Register data, which excludes lakes, ponds, glaciers > 1 km^{2} (0.386 sq mi or 247 acres) and river estuaries.

Beaumont-le-Hareng (French pronunciation: [bomɔ̃ lə aʁɑ̃]) is a commune in the Seine-Maritime department in the Normandy region in northern France.

== Geography ==
Beaumont-le-Hareng is a small farming village in the Pays de Caux, situated some 20 miles (32 km) south of Dieppe, at the junction of the N29 with the D15, D97 and D225 roads.

== Population ==
Historical population
Year	Pop.	±% p.a.
1968	183	—
1975	173	−0.80%
1982	168	−0.42%
1990	192	+1.68%
1999	190	−0.12%
2007	199	+0.58%
2012	243	+4.08%
2017	265	+1.75%
2023	256	−0.57%
Source: INSEE

== Places of interest ==
- Traces of a Merovingian fort.
- The church of St.Pierre, dating from the twelfth century.
- The church of St. Denis, dating from the eighteenth century.

== See also ==
- Communes of the Seine-Maritime department
