= Rocquemont, Seine-Maritime =

Rocquemont
- Commune
- Location of Rocquemont
- Location within France Location within Normandy
- Coordinates: 49°36′14″N 1°17′06″E
- Country: France
- Region: Normandy
- Department: Seine-Maritime
- Arrondissement: Dieppe
- Canton: Neufchâtel-en-Bray
- Intercommunality: CC Bray-Eawy

Government
  - Mayor (2020–2026): Christian Lefebvre
- Area^{1}: 12.26 km^{2} (4.73 sq mi)
- Elevation: 186 m (610 ft)
- Highest elevation: 198 m (650 ft)
- Lowest elevation: 136 m (446 ft)
- Population (2023): 747
  - Density: 60.9/km^{2} (158/sq mi)
- Time zone: UTC+01:00 (CET)
  - Summer (DST): UTC+02:00 (CEST)
- INSEE/Postal code: 76532 /76680
- ^{1} French Land Register data, which excludes lakes, ponds, glaciers > 1 km^{2} (0.386 sq mi or 247 acres) and river estuaries.

Rocquemont (French pronunciation: [ʁɔkmɔ̃]) is a commune in the Seine-Maritime department in the Normandy region in northern France.

== Geography ==
A forestry and farming village situated in the Pays de Bray at the junction of the D928, the D98, the D57 and the D24 roads, some 16 miles (26 km) northeast of Rouen. The A28 autoroute now forms most of the south-western border of the commune.

== Population ==
Historical population
Year	Pop.	±% p.a.
1968	353	—
1975	384	+1.21%
1982	396	+0.44%
1990	453	+1.70%
1999	606	+3.29%
2007	775	+3.12%
2012	820	+1.14%
2017	802	−0.44%
2023	747	−1.18%
Source: INSEE

== Places of interest ==
- A nineteenth century church.

== See also ==
- Communes of the Seine-Maritime department
