= Bradiancourt =

- Commune
- Location of Bradiancourt
- Location within France Location within Normandy
- Coordinates: 49°39′25″N 1°23′20″E
- Country: France
- Region: Normandy
- Department: Seine-Maritime
- Arrondissement: Dieppe
- Canton: Neufchâtel-en-Bray
- Intercommunality: CC Bray-Eawy

Government
  - Mayor (2026–32): Romain Rousselin
- Area^{1}: 4.11 km^{2} (1.59 sq mi)
- Elevation: 220 m (720 ft)
- Highest elevation: 231 m (758 ft)
- Lowest elevation: 189 m (620 ft)
- Population (2023): 221
  - Density: 53.8/km^{2} (139/sq mi)
- Time zone: UTC+01:00 (CET)
  - Summer (DST): UTC+02:00 (CEST)
- INSEE/Postal code: 76139 /76680
- ^{1} French Land Register data, which excludes lakes, ponds, glaciers > 1 km^{2} (0.386 sq mi or 247 acres) and river estuaries.

Bradiancourt (French pronunciation: [bʁadjɑ̃kuʁ]) is a commune in the Seine-Maritime department in the Normandy region in northwestern France.

== Geography ==
A small farming village situated in the Pays de Bray, 31 miles (50 km) southeast of Dieppe, at the junction of the D24 and the D83 roads.

== Population ==
Historical population
Year	Pop.	±% p.a.
1968	114	—
1975	118	+0.49%
1982	117	−0.12%
1990	131	+1.42%
1999	138	+0.58%
2007	183	+3.59%
2012	246	+6.10%
2017	217	−2.48%
2023	221	+0.30%
Source: INSEE

== Places of interest ==
- The Saint-Martin church, dating from the nineteenth century.

== See also ==
- Communes of the Seine-Maritime department
