= Canton of Neufchâtel-en-Bray =

Coordinates: 49°44′38″N 1°28′18″E

Neufchâtel-en-Bray
- Canton
- Country: France
- Region: Normandy
- Department: Seine-Maritime
- No. of communes: {{{nbcomm}}}
- Area: 748.73 km^{2} (289.09 sq mi)
- Population (2023): 33,453
  - Density: 44.680/km^{2} (115.72/sq mi)
- INSEE code: 76 23

The Canton of Neufchâtel-en-Bray is a canton situated in the Seine-Maritime département and in the Normandy region of north-western France.

== Geography ==
An area of farming, forestry and light industry in the arrondissement of Dieppe, centred on the town of Neufchâtel-en-Bray.

== Composition ==
At the French canton reorganisation which came into effect in March 2015, the canton was expanded from 23 to 69 communes:

- Ardouval
- Auvilliers
- Avesnes-en-Val
- Bailleul-Neuville
- Baillolet
- Beaumont-le-Hareng
- Bellencombre
- Bosc-Bérenger
- Bosc-le-Hard
- Bosc-Mesnil
- Bouelles
- Bracquetuit
- Bradiancourt
- Bully
- Bures-en-Bray
- Callengeville
- Clais
- Cottévrard
- La Crique
- Critot
- Croixdalle
- Cropus
- Esclavelles
- Fesques
- Flamets-Frétils
- Fontaine-en-Bray
- Fréauville
- Fresles
- Fresnoy-Folny
- Grandcourt
- Les Grandes-Ventes
- Graval
- Grigneuseville
- Londinières
- Lucy
- Massy
- Mathonville
- Maucomble
- Ménonval
- Mesnières-en-Bray
- Mesnil-Follemprise
- Montérolier
- Mortemer
- Nesle-Hodeng
- Neufbosc
- Neufchâtel-en-Bray
- Neuville-Ferrières
- Osmoy-Saint-Valery
- Pommeréval
- Preuseville
- Puisenval
- Quièvrecourt
- Rocquemont
- Rosay
- Sainte-Agathe-d'Aliermont
- Sainte-Beuve-en-Rivière
- Sainte-Geneviève
- Saint-Hellier
- Saint-Germain-sur-Eaulne
- Saint-Martin-l'Hortier
- Saint-Martin-Osmonville
- Saint-Pierre-des-Jonquières
- Saint-Saëns
- Saint-Saire
- Smermesnil
- Sommery
- Vatierville
- Ventes-Saint-Rémy
- Wanchy-Capval

== Population ==
Historical population
| Year | Pop. | ±% p.a. |
|---|---|---|
| 2013 | 34,512 | — |
| 2018 | 34,151 | −0.21% |
Source: INSEE

== See also ==
- Arrondissements of the Seine-Maritime department
- Cantons of the Seine-Maritime department
- Communes of the Seine-Maritime department
