= Saint-Martin-Osmonville =

- Commune
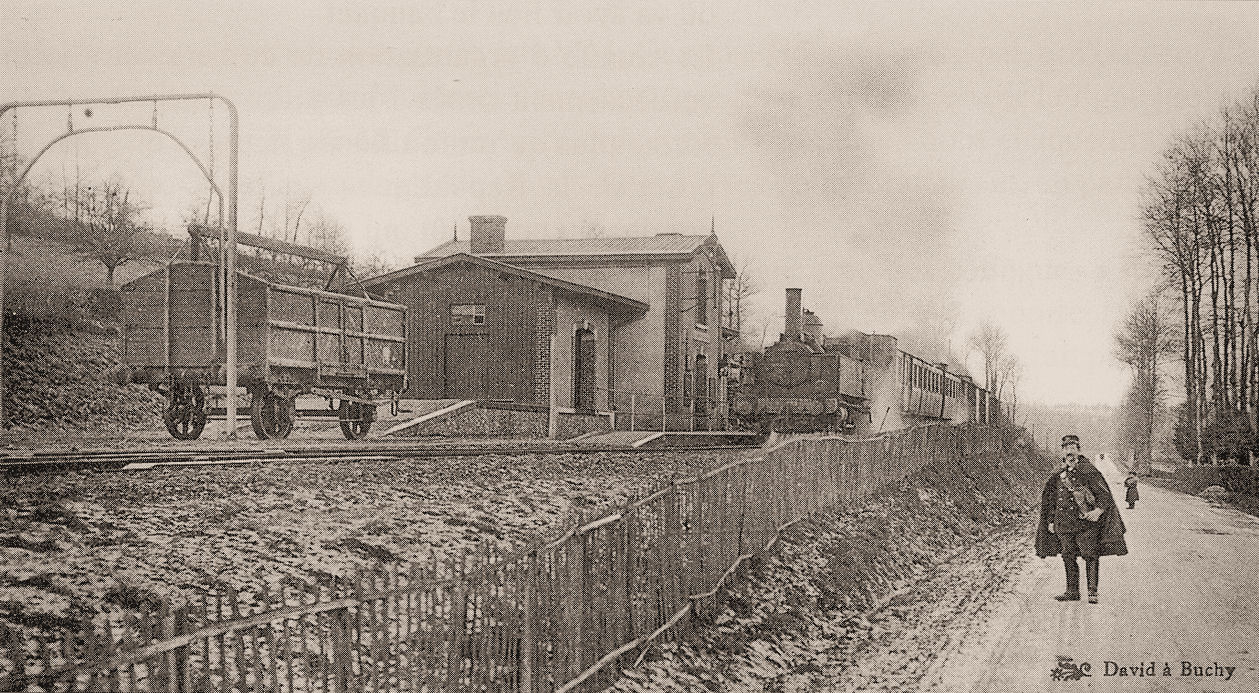
- The railway station at St-Martin-Osmonville around 1900
- Location of Saint-Martin-Osmonville
- Location within France Location within Normandy
- Coordinates: 49°38′25″N 1°18′01″E
- Country: France
- Region: Normandy
- Department: Seine-Maritime
- Arrondissement: Dieppe
- Canton: Neufchâtel-en-Bray
- Intercommunality: CC Bray-Eawy

Government
  - Mayor (2020–2026): Carole Haimonet
- Area^{1}: 21.34 km^{2} (8.24 sq mi)
- Elevation: 176 m (577 ft)
- Highest elevation: 207 m (679 ft)
- Lowest elevation: 110 m (360 ft)
- Population (2023): 1,153
  - Density: 54.03/km^{2} (139.9/sq mi)
- Time zone: UTC+01:00 (CET)
  - Summer (DST): UTC+02:00 (CEST)
- INSEE/Postal code: 76621 /76680
- ^{1} French Land Register data, which excludes lakes, ponds, glaciers > 1 km^{2} (0.386 sq mi or 247 acres) and river estuaries.

Saint-Martin-Osmonville is a commune in the Seine-Maritime department in the Normandy region in northern France.

The inhabitants of the town of Saint-Martin-Osmonville are called Saint-Martinais, Saint-Martinaises in French.

== Geography ==
A farming village comprising several hamlets, situated by the banks of the Varenne river in the Pays de Bray, at the junction of the D38, D41, D154 and the D928 roads, some 30 miles (48 km) southeast of Dieppe. Junction 11 of the A29 autoroute with the A28 autoroute forms much of the northwest border of the commune.

== Population ==
Historical population
Year	Pop.	±% p.a.
1968	708	—
1975	737	+0.58%
1982	756	+0.36%
1990	775	+0.31%
1999	824	+0.68%
2007	1,085	+3.50%
2012	1,168	+1.49%
2017	1,171	+0.05%
2023	1,153	−0.26%
Source: INSEE

== Places of interest ==
- The church of St. Martin, dating from the fifteenth century.
- The thirteenth-century church of St. Martin in the hamlet of La Prée.

== See also ==
- Communes of the Seine-Maritime department
