= Neufbosc =

- Commune
- Location of Neufbosc
- Location within France Location within Normandy
- Coordinates: 49°38′46″N 1°21′52″E
- Country: France
- Region: Normandy
- Department: Seine-Maritime
- Arrondissement: Dieppe
- Canton: Neufchâtel-en-Bray
- Intercommunality: CC Bray-Eawy

Government
  - Mayor (2026–32): Emilie Guérin
- Area^{1}: 5.14 km^{2} (1.98 sq mi)
- Elevation: 218 m (715 ft)
- Highest elevation: 218 m (715 ft)
- Lowest elevation: 140 m (460 ft)
- Population (2023): 397
  - Density: 77.2/km^{2} (200/sq mi)
- Time zone: UTC+01:00 (CET)
  - Summer (DST): UTC+02:00 (CEST)
- INSEE/Postal code: 76461 /76680
- ^{1} French Land Register data, which excludes lakes, ponds, glaciers > 1 km^{2} (0.386 sq mi or 247 acres) and river estuaries.

Neufbosc is a commune in the Seine-Maritime department in the Normandy region in northern France.

An inhabitant of the town of Neufbosc is called Neufboscois (masculine) or Neufboscoise (feminine) in French, with plurals Neufboscois and Neufboscoises, respectively.

== Geography ==
A farming village situated in the Pays de Bray, some 24 miles (39 km) southeast of Dieppe at the junction of the D24 with the D118 roads.

== Population ==
Historical population
Year	Pop.	±% p.a.
1968	207	—
1975	195	−0.85%
1982	214	+1.34%
1990	251	+2.01%
1999	274	+0.98%
2007	334	+2.51%
2012	382	+2.72%
2017	403	+1.08%
2023	397	−0.25%
Source: INSEE

== Places of interest ==
- The church of St.Jean & St.Nicolas, dating from the nineteenth century.
- Traces of a feudal castle.

== See also ==
- Communes of the Seine-Maritime department
