= Sainte-Geneviève, Seine-Maritime =

Sainte-Geneviève
- Commune
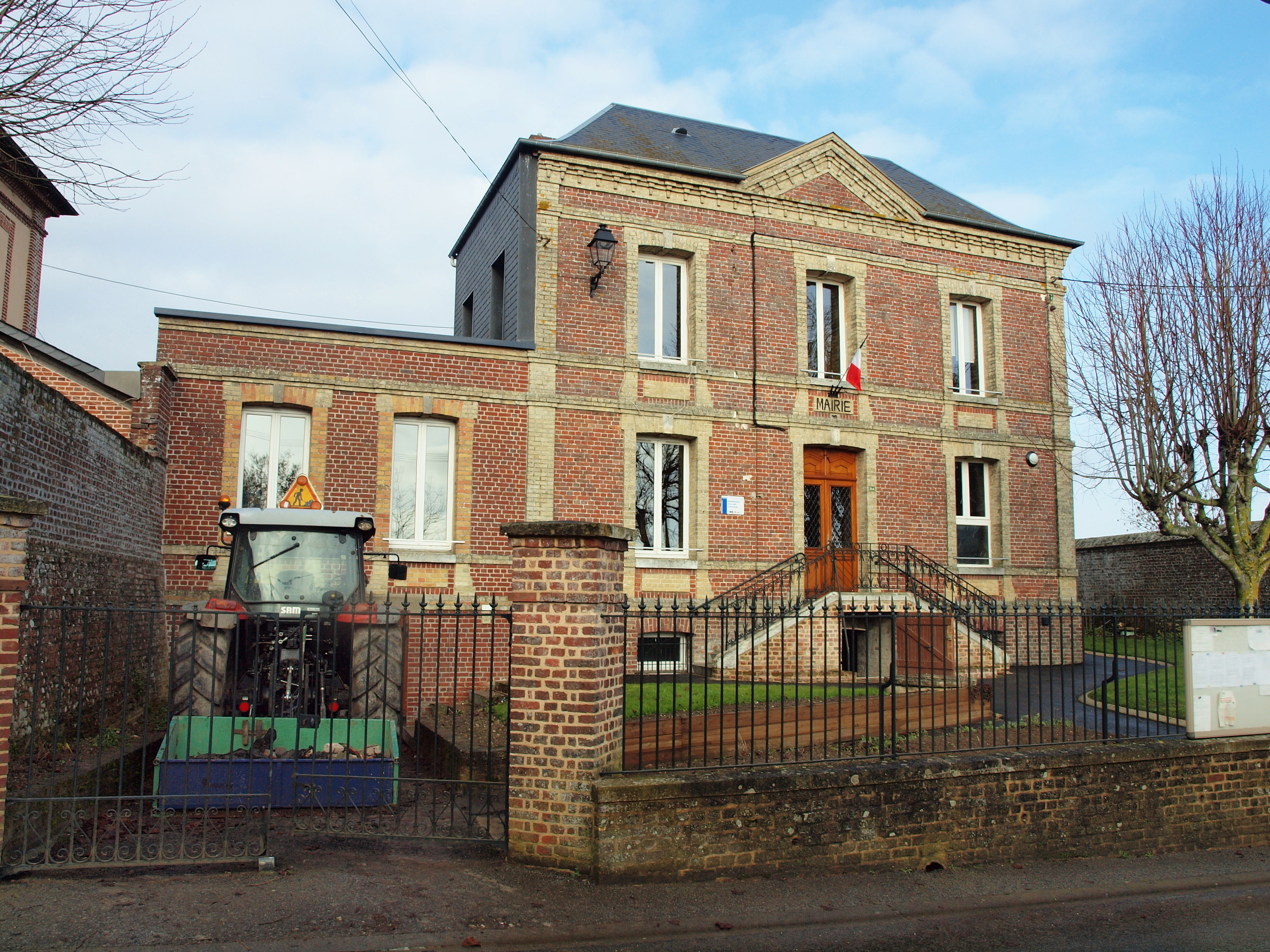
- The town hall in Sainte-Geneviève

- Coat of arms
- Location of Sainte-Geneviève
- Location within France Location within Normandy
- Coordinates: 49°39′16″N 1°26′07″E
- Country: France
- Region: Normandy
- Department: Seine-Maritime
- Arrondissement: Dieppe
- Canton: Neufchâtel-en-Bray
- Intercommunality: CC Bray-Eawy

Government
  - Mayor (2020–2026): Robert Gressier
- Area^{1}: 14.33 km^{2} (5.53 sq mi)
- Elevation: 172 m (564 ft)
- Highest elevation: 231 m (758 ft)
- Lowest elevation: 103 m (338 ft)
- Population (2023): 255
  - Density: 17.8/km^{2} (46.1/sq mi)
- Time zone: UTC+01:00 (CET)
  - Summer (DST): UTC+02:00 (CEST)
- INSEE/Postal code: 76578 /76440
- ^{1} French Land Register data, which excludes lakes, ponds, glaciers > 1 km^{2} (0.386 sq mi or 247 acres) and river estuaries.

Sainte-Geneviève (French pronunciation: [sɛ̃t ʒənvjɛv]; sometimes Sainte-Geneviève-en-Bray, lit. 'Sainte-Geneviève in Bray') is a commune in the Seine-Maritime department in the Normandy region in northern France.

== Geography ==
A farming village situated in the Pays de Bray, some 28 miles (45 km) southeast of Dieppe at the junction of the D1, the D83 and the D915 roads. Three small tributaries of the river Béthune have their source in the land around the commune.

== Population ==
Historical population
Year	Pop.	±% p.a.
1968	435	—
1975	348	−3.14%
1982	307	−1.77%
1990	253	−2.39%
1999	251	−0.09%
2007	280	+1.38%
2012	301	+1.46%
2017	270	−2.15%
2023	255	−0.95%
Source: INSEE

== Places of interest ==
- The church of St. Geneviève, dating from the thirteenth century.
- The chateau of Mainemare and its park.

== See also ==
- Communes of the Seine-Maritime department
