= Auvilliers =

- Commune
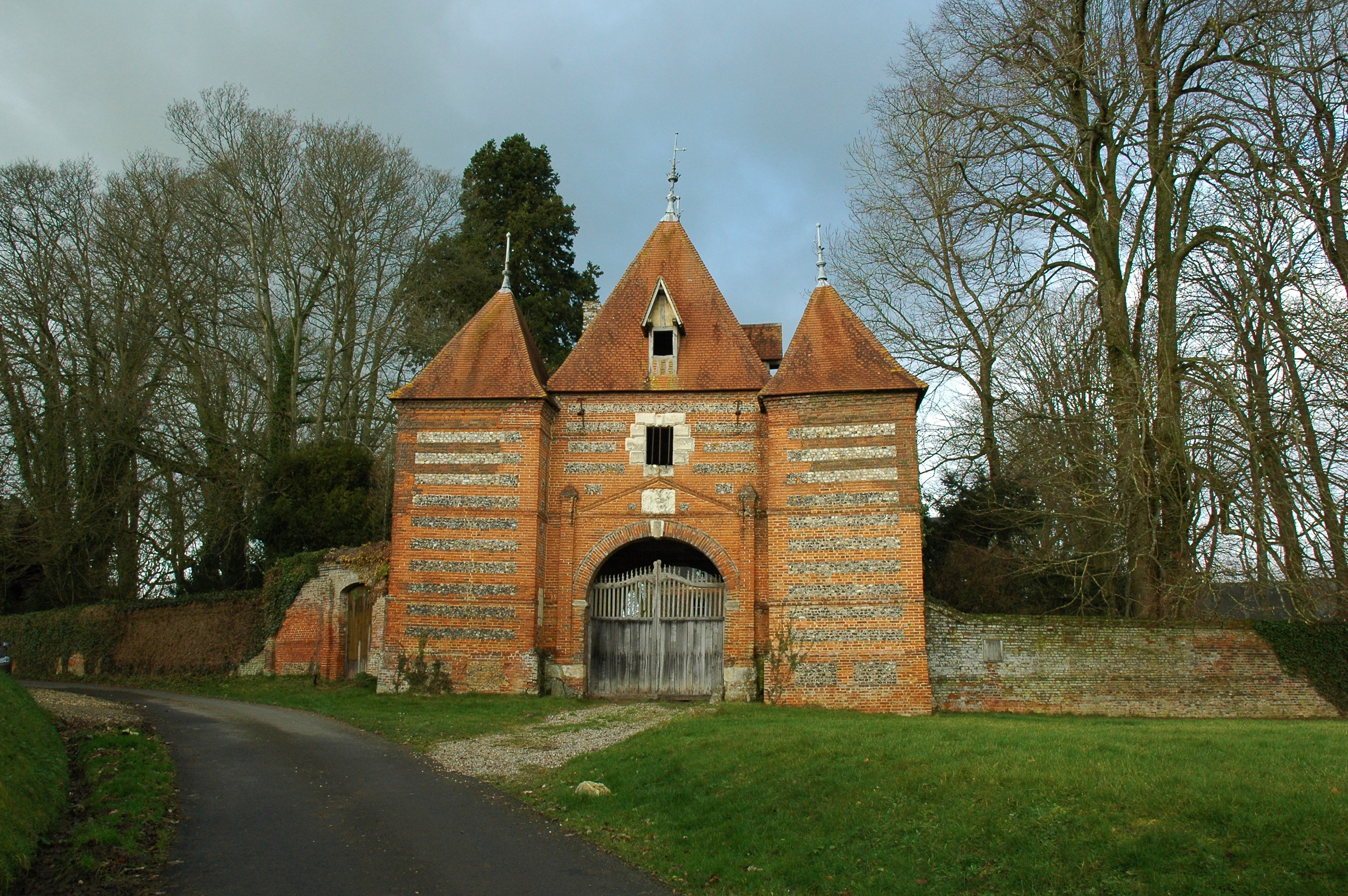
- The chateau gates in Auvilliers
- Location of Auvilliers
- Location within France Location within Normandy
- Coordinates: 49°45′36″N 1°34′37″E
- Country: France
- Region: Normandy
- Department: Seine-Maritime
- Arrondissement: Dieppe
- Canton: Neufchâtel-en-Bray
- Intercommunality: CC Bray-Eawy

Government
  - Mayor (2026–32): Eric Van Damme
- Area^{1}: 4.89 km^{2} (1.89 sq mi)
- Elevation: 236 m (774 ft)
- Highest elevation: 239 m (784 ft)
- Lowest elevation: 190 m (620 ft)
- Population (2023): 101
  - Density: 20.7/km^{2} (53.5/sq mi)
- Time zone: UTC+01:00 (CET)
  - Summer (DST): UTC+02:00 (CEST)
- INSEE/Postal code: 76042 /76270
- ^{1} French Land Register data, which excludes lakes, ponds, glaciers > 1 km^{2} (0.386 sq mi or 247 acres) and river estuaries.

Auvilliers (French pronunciation: [ovilje]) is a commune in the Seine-Maritime department in the Normandy region in northern France.

== Geography ==
A small farming village situated in the Pays de Caux, some 26 miles (42 km) southeast of Dieppe, at the junction of the D59 and D7 roads, just to the north of the N29 and the A29 autoroute. It was here that petit-suisse cheese was first produced.

== Population ==
Historical population
Year	Pop.	±% p.a.
1968	128	—
1975	124	−0.45%
1982	118	−0.71%
1990	105	−1.45%
1999	107	+0.21%
2007	92	−1.87%
2012	124	+6.15%
2017	101	−4.02%
2023	101	+0.00%
Source: INSEE

== Places of interest ==
- The eighteenth century church of St.Jean-Baptiste.
- A chateau dating from the nineteenth century.

== See also ==
- Communes of the Seine-Maritime department
