= Bosc-Bérenger =

- Commune
- Location of Bosc-Bérenger
- Location within France Location within Normandy
- Coordinates: 49°38′08″N 1°15′26″E
- Country: France
- Region: Normandy
- Department: Seine-Maritime
- Arrondissement: Dieppe
- Canton: Neufchâtel-en-Bray
- Intercommunality: CC Bray-Eawy
- Area^{1}: 3.38 km^{2} (1.31 sq mi)
- Elevation: 180 m (590 ft)
- Highest elevation: 183 m (600 ft)
- Lowest elevation: 149 m (489 ft)
- Population (2023): 194
  - Density: 57.4/km^{2} (149/sq mi)
- Time zone: UTC+01:00 (CET)
  - Summer (DST): UTC+02:00 (CEST)
- INSEE/Postal code: 76119 /76680
- ^{1} French Land Register data, which excludes lakes, ponds, glaciers > 1 km^{2} (0.386 sq mi or 247 acres) and river estuaries.

Bosc-Bérenger is a commune in the Seine-Maritime department in the Normandy region in northern France.

== Geography ==
A small farming village situated in the Pays de Bray, some 25 miles (40 km) southeast of Dieppe, at the junction of the D96 and the D12 roads. The A29 autoroute and the A28 autoroute surround the village on 2 of its 3 sides.

== Population ==
Historical population
Year	Pop.	±% p.a.
1968	121	—
1975	123	+0.23%
1982	135	+1.34%
1990	125	−0.96%
1999	177	+3.94%
2007	185	+0.55%
2012	180	−0.55%
2017	190	+1.09%
2023	194	+0.35%
Source: INSEE

== Places of interest ==
- The church of the Trinity, dating from the twelfth century.

== See also ==
- Communes of the Seine-Maritime department
