= Critot =

- Commune
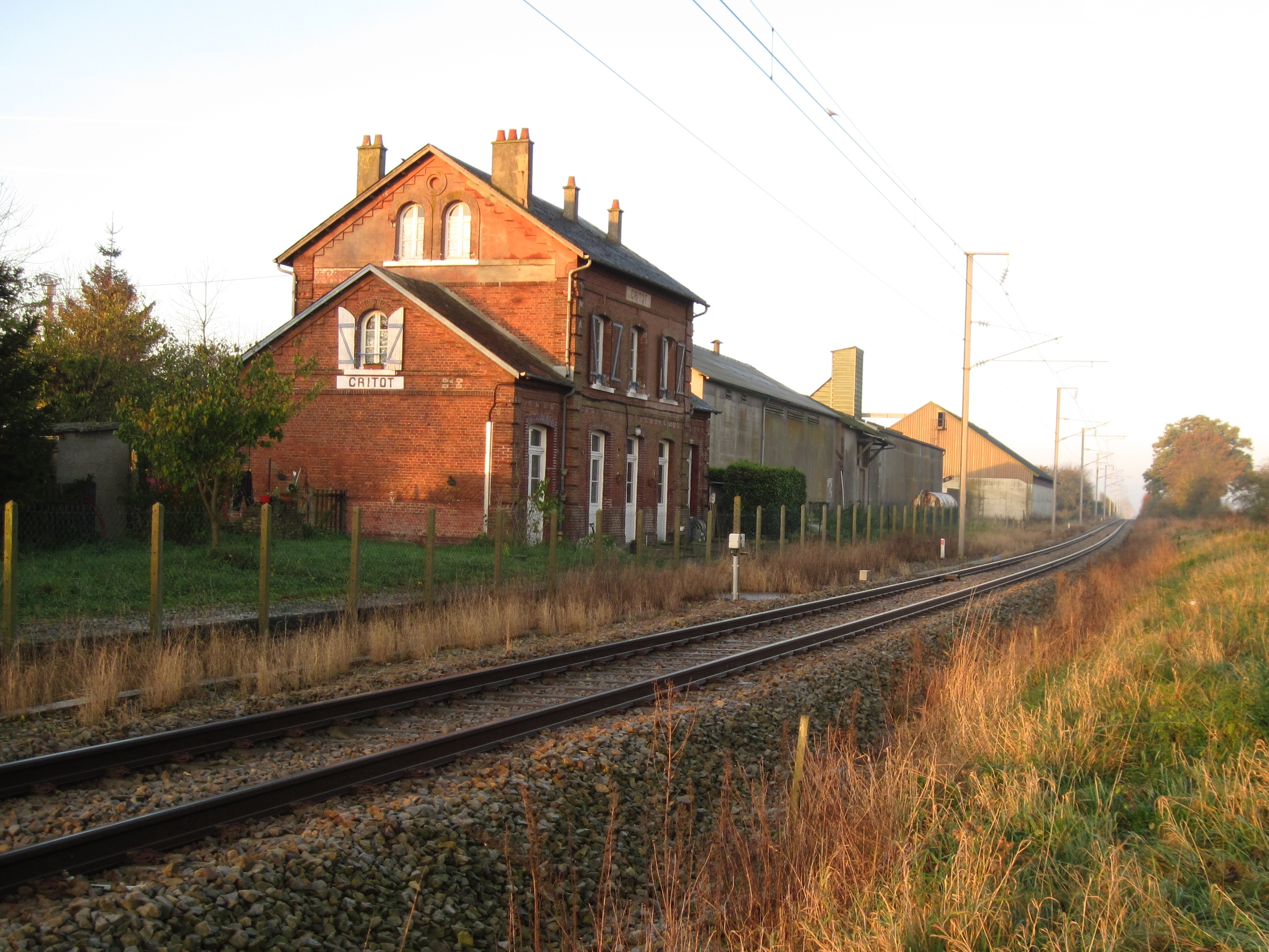
- The former railway station in Critot
- Location of Critot
- Location within France Location within Normandy
- Coordinates: 49°36′45″N 1°15′07″E
- Country: France
- Region: Normandy
- Department: Seine-Maritime
- Arrondissement: Dieppe
- Canton: Neufchâtel-en-Bray
- Intercommunality: CC Bray-Eawy

Government
  - Mayor (2026–32): Isabelle Lhermitte
- Area^{1}: 7.05 km^{2} (2.72 sq mi)
- Elevation: 171 m (561 ft)
- Highest elevation: 187 m (614 ft)
- Lowest elevation: 152 m (499 ft)
- Population (2023): 544
  - Density: 77.2/km^{2} (200/sq mi)
- Time zone: UTC+01:00 (CET)
  - Summer (DST): UTC+02:00 (CEST)
- INSEE/Postal code: 76200 /76680
- ^{1} French Land Register data, which excludes lakes, ponds, glaciers > 1 km^{2} (0.386 sq mi or 247 acres) and river estuaries.

Critot (French pronunciation: [kʁito]) is a commune in the Seine-Maritime department in the Normandy region in northern France.

== Geography ==
A farming village situated in the Pays de Bray, some 32 miles (51 km) south of Dieppe, at the junction of the D12 and the D57 roads. The A28 autoroute borders the commune to the east.

== Population ==
Historical population
Year	Pop.	±% p.a.
1968	233	—
1975	234	+0.06%
1982	278	+2.49%
1990	462	+6.56%
1999	451	−0.27%
2007	512	+1.60%
2012	506	−0.24%
2017	465	−1.68%
2023	544	+2.65%
Source: INSEE

== Places of interest ==
- The church of St.Martin, dating from the seventeenth century.

== See also ==
- Communes of the Seine-Maritime department
