= Bosc-Mesnil =

- Commune
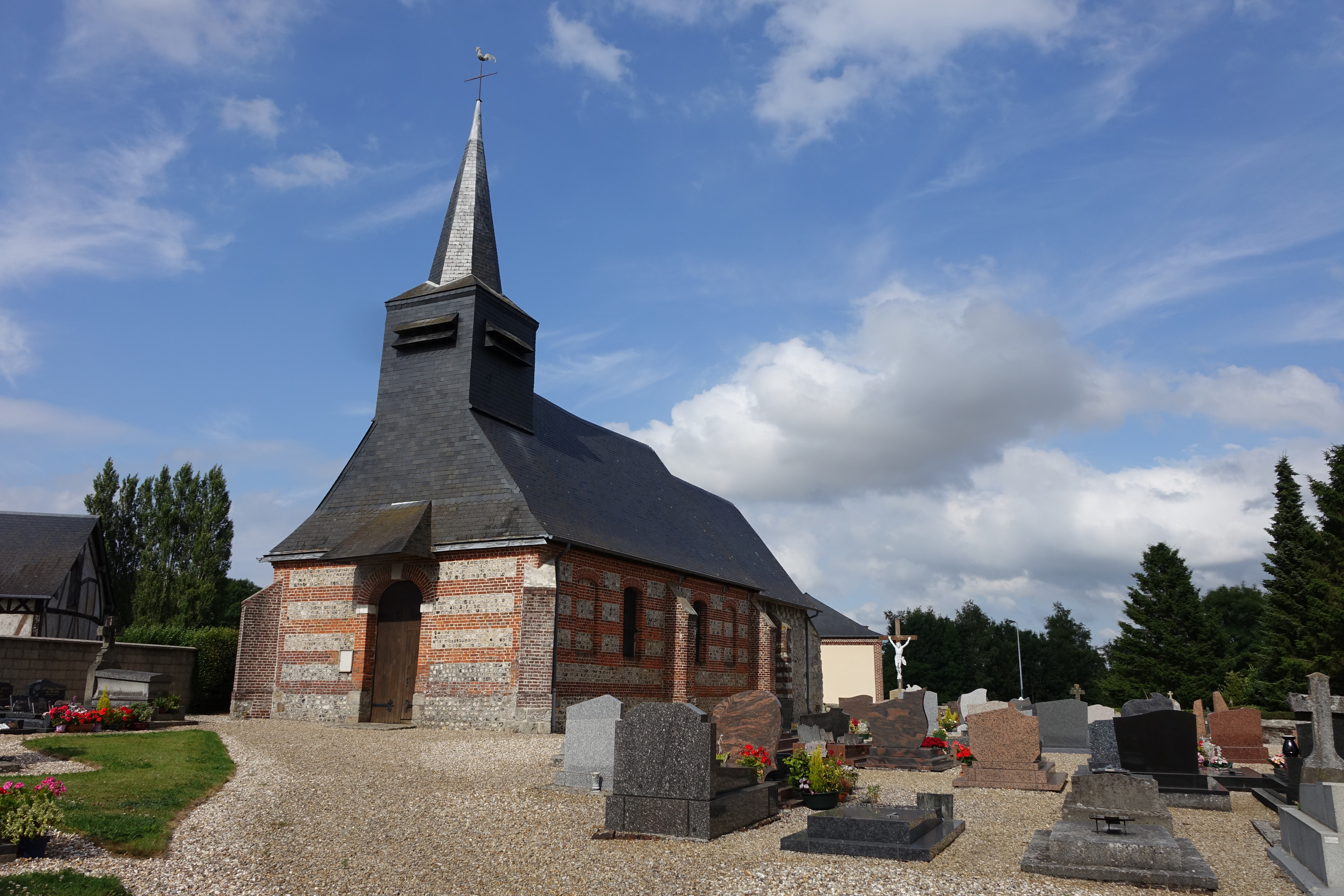
- The church in Bosc-Mesnil
- Location of Bosc-Mesnil
- Location within France Location within Normandy
- Coordinates: 49°39′44″N 1°20′56″E
- Country: France
- Region: Normandy
- Department: Seine-Maritime
- Arrondissement: Dieppe
- Canton: Neufchâtel-en-Bray
- Intercommunality: CC Bray-Eawy

Government
  - Mayor (2026–32): François Battement
- Area^{1}: 9.37 km^{2} (3.62 sq mi)
- Elevation: 209 m (686 ft)
- Highest elevation: 230 m (750 ft)
- Lowest elevation: 139 m (456 ft)
- Population (2023): 318
  - Density: 33.9/km^{2} (87.9/sq mi)
- Time zone: UTC+01:00 (CET)
  - Summer (DST): UTC+02:00 (CEST)
- INSEE/Postal code: 76126 /76680
- ^{1} French Land Register data, which excludes lakes, ponds, glaciers > 1 km^{2} (0.386 sq mi or 247 acres) and river estuaries.

Bosc-Mesnil is a commune in the Seine-Maritime department in the Normandy region in northern France.

== Geography ==
A small farming village situated in the Pays de Bray, some 25 miles (40 km) southeast of Dieppe, at the junction of the D83 and the D118 roads. The A28 autoroute forms the north and western borders of the commune.

== Population ==
Historical population
Year	Pop.	±% p.a.
1968	231	—
1975	210	−1.35%
1982	174	−2.65%
1990	219	+2.92%
1999	212	−0.36%
2007	255	+2.34%
2012	295	+2.96%
2017	312	+1.13%
2023	318	+0.32%
Source: INSEE

== Places of interest ==
- The church of St.Ouen, dating from the seventeenth century.

== See also ==
- Communes of the Seine-Maritime department
