= Maucomble =

- Commune
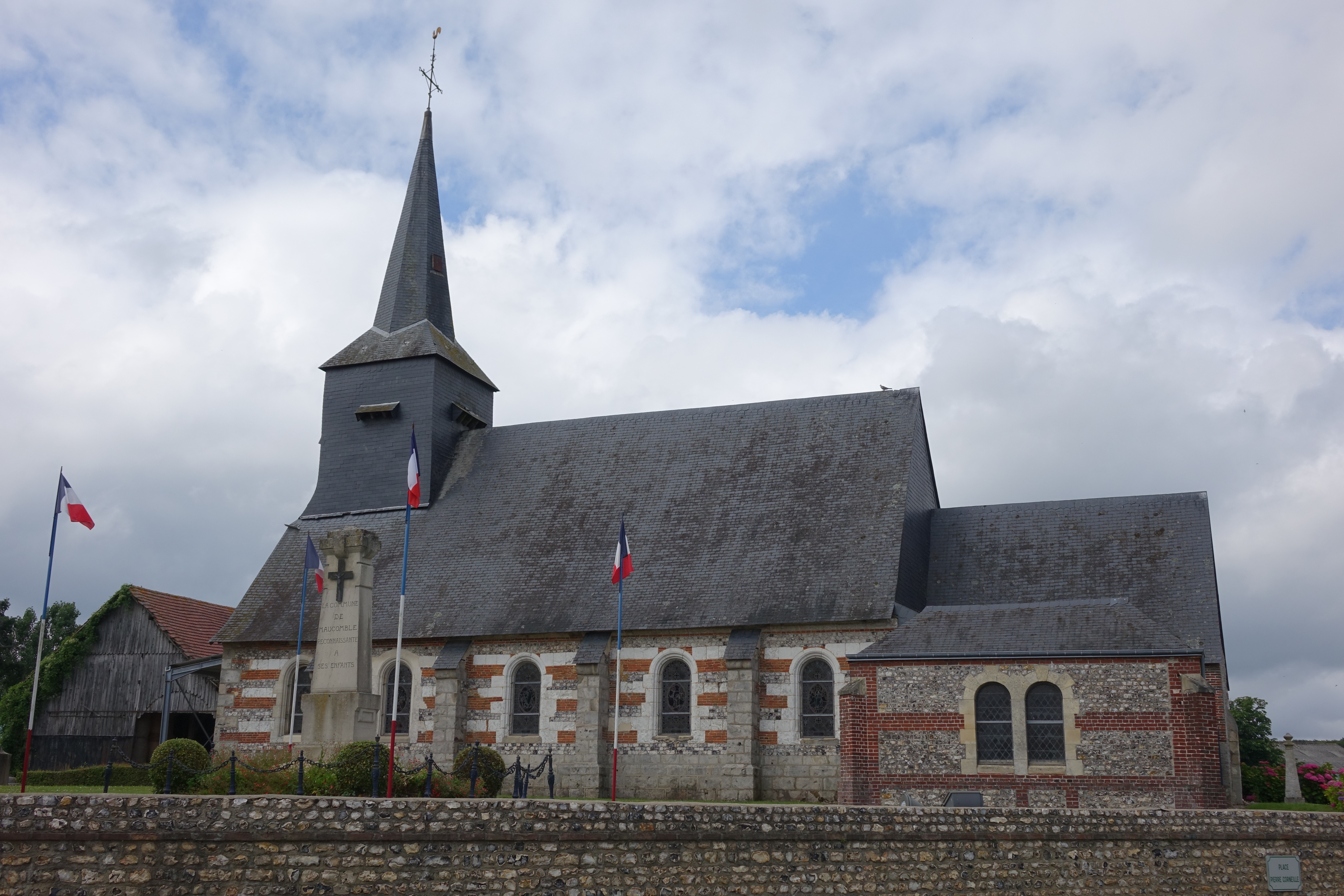
- The church in Maucomble
- Location of Maucomble
- Location within France Location within Normandy
- Coordinates: 49°40′58″N 1°20′03″E
- Country: France
- Region: Normandy
- Department: Seine-Maritime
- Arrondissement: Dieppe
- Canton: Neufchâtel-en-Bray
- Intercommunality: CC Bray-Eawy

Government
  - Mayor (2026–32): Léon Bachelot
- Area^{1}: 5.07 km^{2} (1.96 sq mi)
- Elevation: 200 m (660 ft)
- Highest elevation: 235 m (771 ft)
- Lowest elevation: 149 m (489 ft)
- Population (2023): 383
  - Density: 75.5/km^{2} (196/sq mi)
- Time zone: UTC+01:00 (CET)
  - Summer (DST): UTC+02:00 (CEST)
- INSEE/Postal code: 76417 /76680
- ^{1} French Land Register data, which excludes lakes, ponds, glaciers > 1 km^{2} (0.386 sq mi or 247 acres) and river estuaries.

Maucomble (French pronunciation: [mokɔ̃bl]) is a commune in the Seine-Maritime department in the Normandy region in northern France.

== Geography ==
A farming and forestry village situated in the Pays de Bray, some 31 miles (50 km) southeast of Dieppe at the junction of the D118 and the D929 roads. The A28 autoroute passes through the territory of the commune.

== Population ==
Historical population
Year	Pop.	±% p.a.
1968	303	—
1975	315	+0.56%
1982	278	−1.77%
1990	318	+1.69%
1999	321	+0.10%
2007	318	−0.12%
2012	384	+3.84%
2017	415	+1.56%
2023	383	−1.33%
Source: INSEE

== Places of interest ==
- The church of St.Ouen, dating from the thirteenth century.

== See also ==
- Communes of the Seine-Maritime department
