= Pays de Bray =

Natural region in Normandy, France

Coordinates: 49°50′N 01°25′E

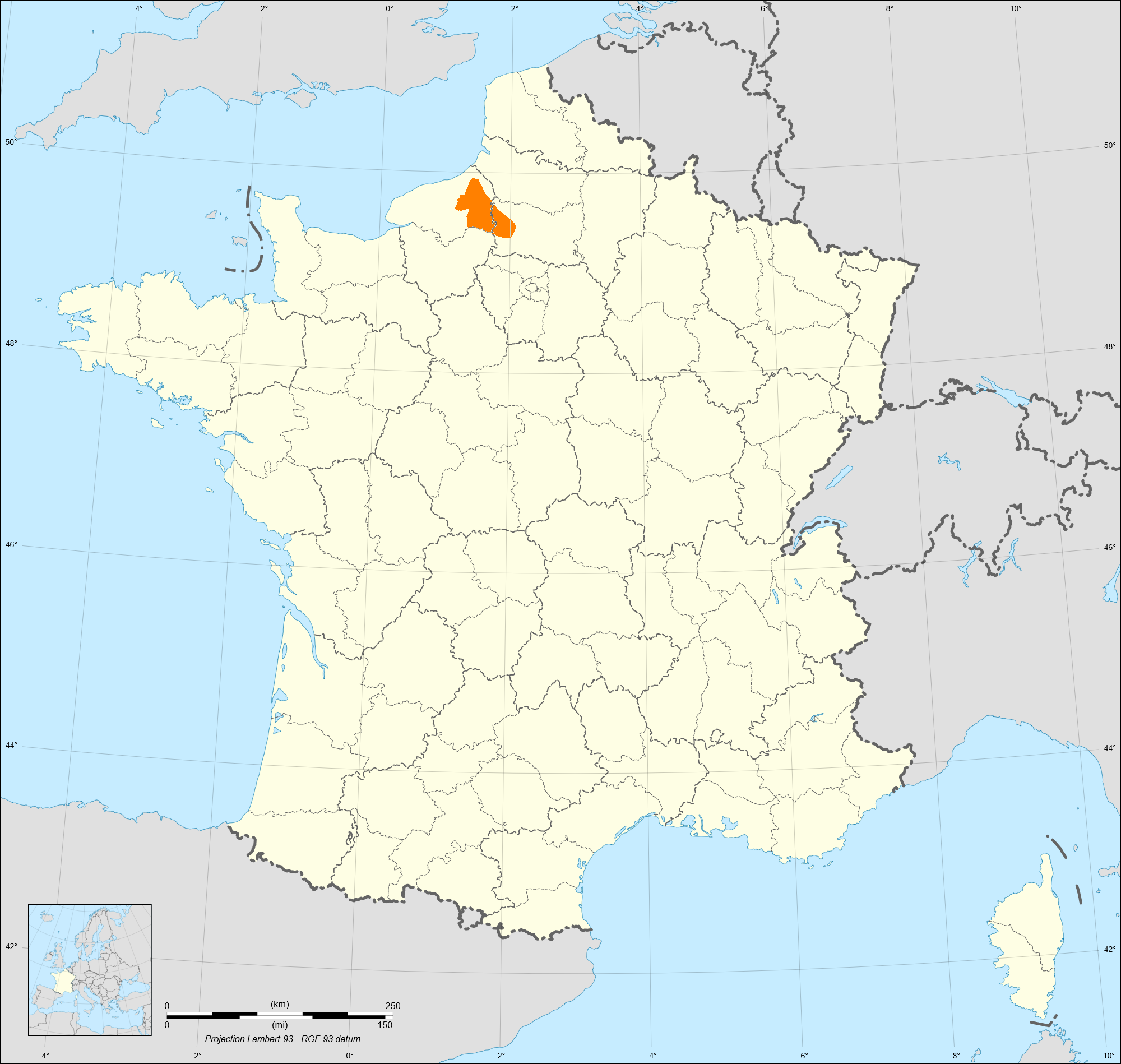
Location within France

The Pays de Bray (French pronunciation: [pe.i də bʁɛ], literally Land of Bray) is a small (about 750 km^{2}) natural region of France situated to the north-east of Rouen, straddling the French departments of the Seine-Maritime and the Oise (historically divided among the Provinces of Normandy and Picardy since 911, now divided among the administrative regions of Normandy and Picardy). The landscape is of bocage, a land use which arises from its clay soil, and is suited to the development of pasture for the raising of dairy cattle. It produces famous butters and cheeses such as Neufchâtel.

== Etymology ==
Etymologically, the name of Bray comes from the Gaulish word braco, which became the Old French bray, meaning "marsh", "swamp", or "mud". The area appears to be so named as the soil distinguishes it from the neighbouring Pays de Caux; the sticky clay is quite different from the dry, firm chalk of the Pays de Caux.

== Geology ==
Viewed geologically, the Pays de Bray is a relatively small eroded anticline along the Bray fault, breaking through rocks on the fringe of the Parisian Basin, which forms the chalk plateaus around it. It is a smaller version of the Weald of Kent and Sussex, but reveals the beds more deeply; down to the Upper Jurassic clay.

To the north is the Upper Cretaceous plateau of Picardy with the Pays de Caux to the west and the Vexin to the south-east. The erosion has exposed clay beds in an elliptically-shaped region which is called the buttonhole of the Pays de Bray. A "boutonnière" (buttonhole), in French geological language, is an eroded anticline. This is why the Pays de Bray's outline is shaped as a buttonhole, marked as it is with surrounding escarpments of 60 to 100 metres in height, making it a distinct physical and cultural entity.

The Pays de Bray is rich in springs and several watercourses rise there; notably the Epte and the Andelle, tributaries of the Seine. The Béthune and the Eaulne flow into the Arques which enters the English Channel at Dieppe. Among the most notable springs are those of Forges-les-Eaux ("Forges-the-Waters") which gave it and its surroundings the renown of a spa. As a result of its clay-rich soil, the traditional building style of the Pays de Bray is of cob (sometimes changed to brick since the 19th) and tile throughout, showing wattle and daub structures.

=== The cross-Channel geological structure ===
The Bray Fault is part of the Lizard front which is represented also in The Lizard and Start Point, Devon. It is also part of the anticline which lies to the south of the Isle of Wight. The chalk of that island's central ridge is cognate with that of the Pays de Bray's northern escarpment. The syncline to the north of the Isle of Wight underlies the Hampshire Basin and rises in the next anticline to form Salisbury Plain and the Wealden ridge of which the territory of Boulogne-sur-Mer, the Boulonnais is the equivalent feature in France. The syncline of south Hampshire is represented by the bay and département of Somme.

Fundamentally, the Bray fault dates from the late Carboniferous and Early Permian but the effect in France and England, of its associated earth movements, has quietly continued so as to gently fold the overlying Jurassic and Cretaceous strata.

== Geography ==
The main towns of the Pays de Bray are Neufchâtel-en-Bray, Forges-les-Eaux and Gournay-en-Bray. It is primarily an agricultural region. Its "brand" products are its three AOC, Neufchâtel cheese, the cider spirit, Calvados and Normandy pommeau. The famous local speciality of fromage frais called petit Suisse was launched from a farm near Gournay-en-Bray; Charles Gervais set up his first factory at Ferrières-en-Bray and his second one at Neufchâtel-en-Bray (closed in 2009).

=== Communications ===
==== Road ====
The Pays de Bray is served by several axial roads:

- From south-east to northwest the "route départmentale" (D road) D 915 (former route nationale 15), the Paris-to-Dieppe.
- From north-east to south-west, the A28 autoroute (motorway or turnpike), joining Abbeville to Rouen and Tours.
- From east to west, the route nationale 31 which joins Reims and Rouen by Beauvais.
- From east to west, the A29 autoroute which joins Saint-Quentin and Caen by Amiens and Le Havre.

==== Rail ====
The rail network is reduced to two lines. The main one, electrified, joins Rouen-Rive-Droite to Amiens. The second was joining between gare de Paris-Saint-Lazare and Dieppe via Pontoise but is closed between Serqueux (where it meets the first one) and Dieppe.

=== Adjoining natural regions ===
- Pays de Caux (to the west)
- Vexin normand (to the south)
- Pays de Thelle (to the south-east)
- Beauvaisis (to the east)
- Petit-Caux (to the north)

== Sources ==
- French Wikipedia article: Pays de Bray
- BRGM Carte géologique de la France à l'échelle du millionième 6th edition. (2003) ISBN 2-7159-2158-6
