= Montérolier-Buchy–Saint-Saëns railway =

Former railway in France

Overview
- Status: Inactive
- Owner: RFF
- Locale: France (Normandy)
- Termini: Montérolier-Buchy station; Saint-Saëns

Service
- System: SNCF
- Operator(s): SNCF

History
- Opened: 1900
- Closed: 1953

Technical
- Line length: 10.2 km (6.3 mi)
- Number of tracks: Double track
- Track gauge: 1,435 mm (4 ft 8 1/2 in)

The Montérolier-Buchy–Saint-Saëns railway is a standard gauge branch line that operated between 1900 and 1953 in the département of Seine-Maritime, France. The line ran 10.2 kilometres (6.3 mi) in a roughly north-northwesterly direction, beginning in Montérolier-Buchy station (which is located in the commune of Montérolier and is a part of the Amiens–Rouen railway) and terminating in the small town of Saint-Saëns. The line passed through the town of Saint-Martin-Osmonville and over the Pont-du-Thil. It was administered on behalf of the département by the Compagnie des chemins de fer du Nord. The line is a cul-de-sac.

== History ==
=== Planning ===
When the Amiens-Rouen railway was commissioned on April 8, 1867 by the Compagnie des chemins de fer du Nord, the town of Saint-Saëns was excluded from its route. It was a distance of some 10 kilometres (6.2 mi) to the nearest station, the Gare de Montérolier-Buchy, and a lack of local public transport made it difficult for residents of the municipality to access the railway. This lack of access affected the local economy, particularly in the manufacturing sector, with the industries of cotton spinning and leather tanning suffering from import and export of both raw materials and produce.

=== Construction ===
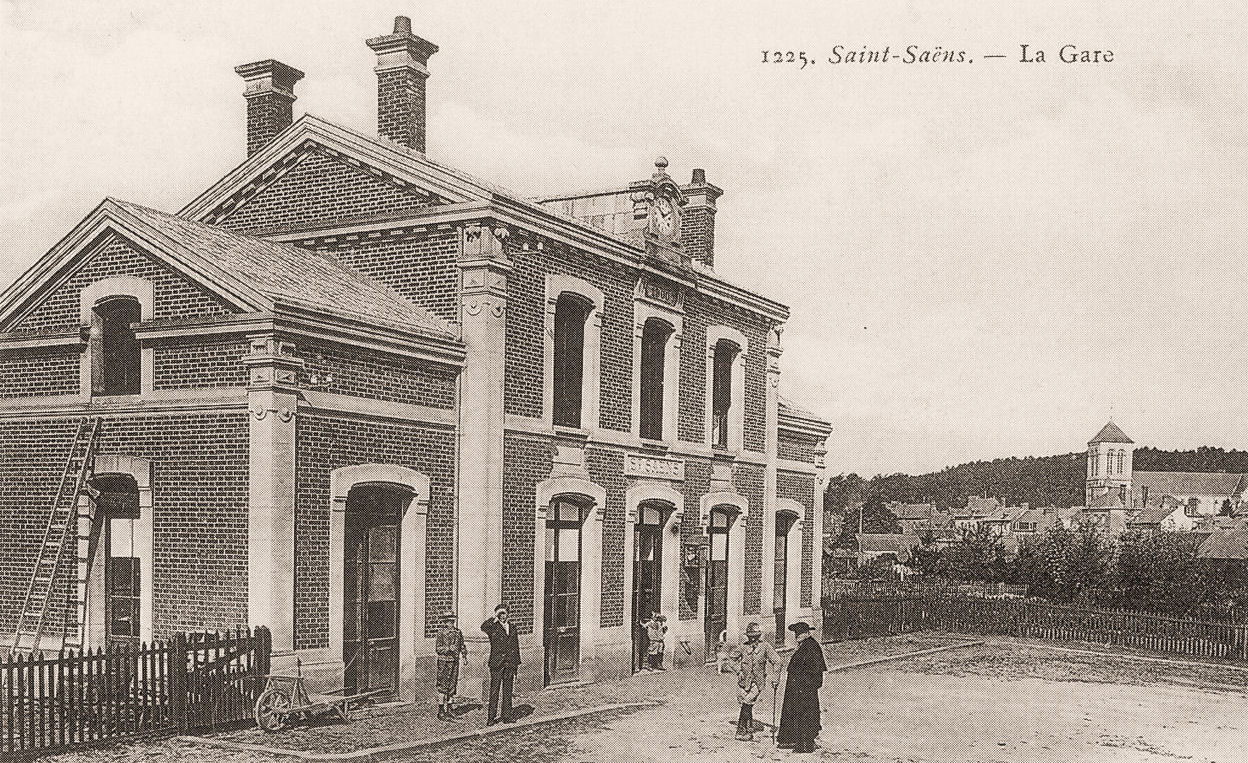
The town station, built with grant funds

After the survey for the planning of the route was completed on April 16, 1896, the town council made a decision on the route of the proposed branch line, and opted for the most direct route, bypassing the intervening communes of Montérolier, Neufbosc, Mathonville, and Bradiancourt. This route, which extended 1.7 kilometres (1.1 mi) further east to meet the demands of the town council, met with the opposition of the railway company operating the Amiens-Roun line. However, a deal was agreed upon and the company agreed to begin work on the construction of the line.

The town of Saint-Saëns, wishing to hasten the construction and associate itself with the building of the line, decided on May 18, 1897 to provide the sum of 60,000 francs towards the construction of the line. However, the sum was only enough for the construction of a station. The work was carried out expeditiously, although there were two fatalities in December 1899. The line was commissioned on schedule and opened on October 14, 1900.

=== Closure ===
After World War II, the line was no longer profitable, and it closed on January 1, 1953.
