= Sommery station =

French railway station

Sommery
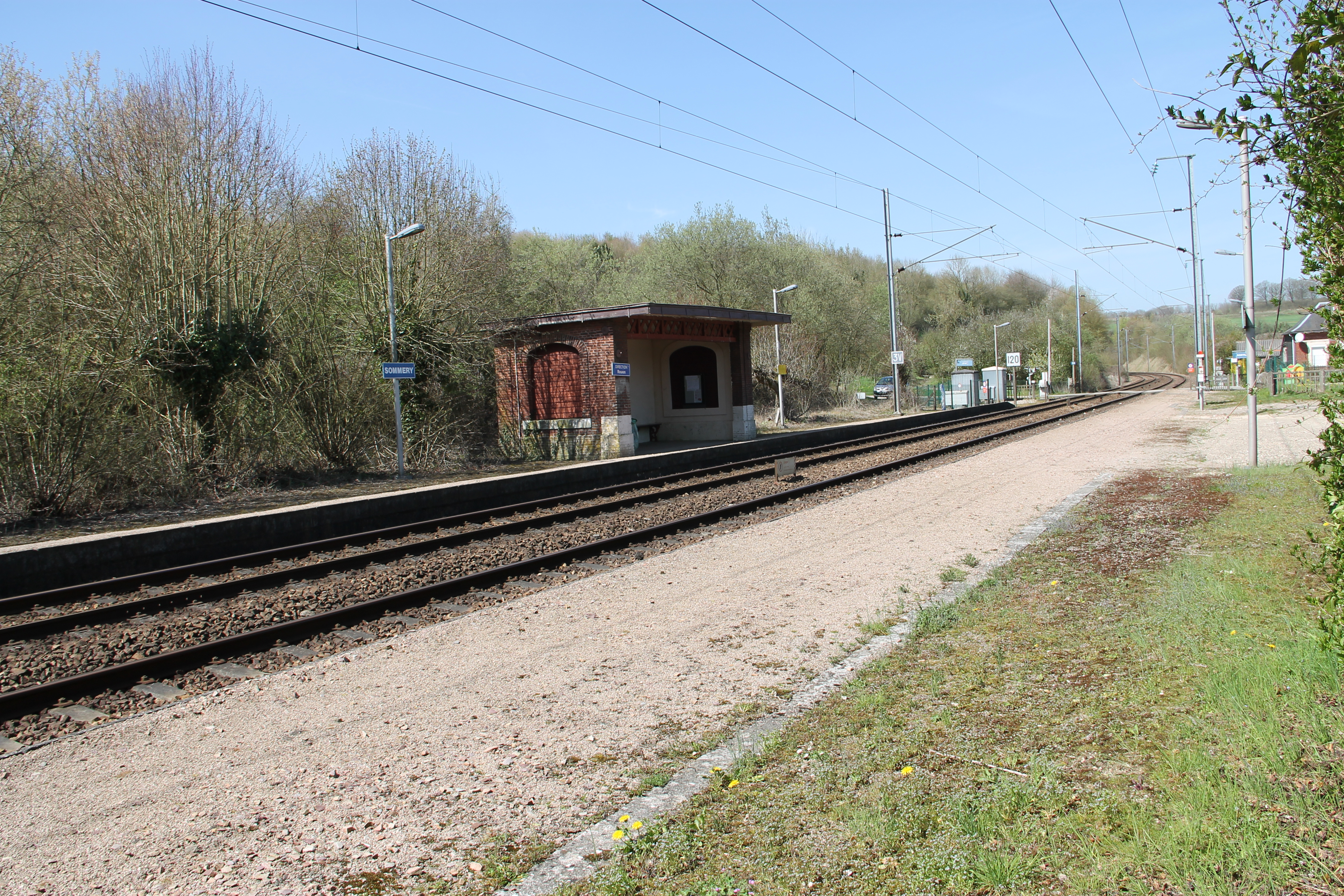

General information
- Coordinates: 49°37′46″N 1°26′9″E
- Owner: RFF/SNCF
- Line: Amiens–Rouen railway
- Platforms: 2
- Tracks: 2

Other information
- Station code: 87411462

Services
Preceding station	TER Hauts-de-France	Following station
Serqueux towards Amiens	Proxi P45	Montérolier–Buchy towards Rouen-RD
Location

The Gare de Sommery (Sommery station) is a railway station located in the commune of Sommery in the Seine-Maritime department, France. The station is served by TER Normandie and TER Hauts-de-France trains from Amiens to Rouen.

== See also ==
- List of SNCF stations in Normandy
