= Grouchy =

Grouchy (or de Grouchy) is a French surname.

- Johannes de Grocheio (Johannes de Grocheio) (c. 1255 – c. 1320), French musical theorist
- Jean de Grouchy (1354 - 1435), knight at the time of the Hundred Years' War
- Sophie de Condorcet (Sophie de Condorcet) (1764 - 1822), born Marie-Louise-Sophie de Grouchy, French writer and wife of Nicolas de Condorcet
- Emmanuel de Grouchy (1768-1847), soldier and Marshal of France
