= Harfleur =

- Commune
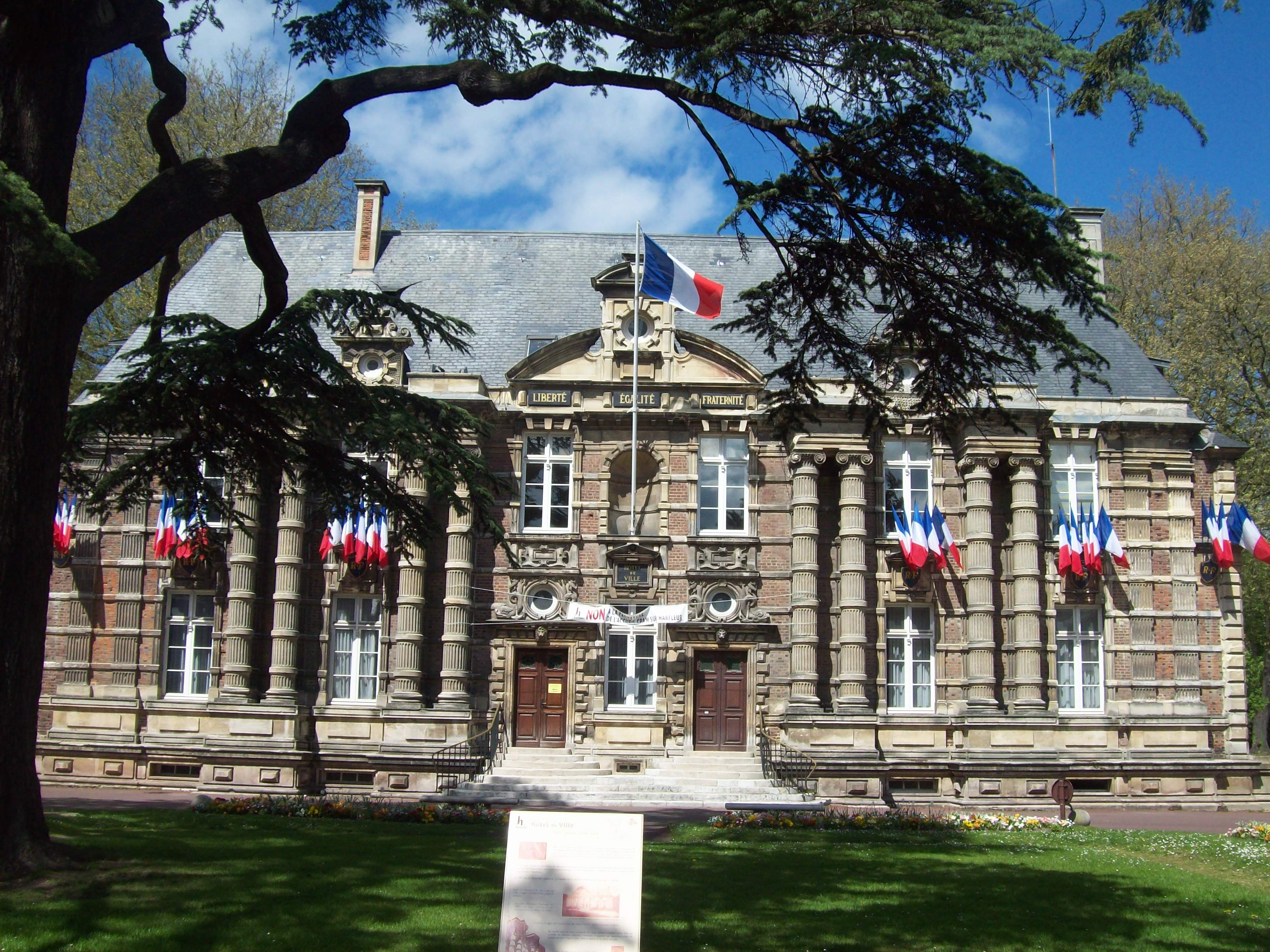
- The town hall in Harfleur

- Coat of arms
- Location of Harfleur
- Location within France Location within Normandy
- Coordinates: 49°30′26″N 0°11′56″E
- Country: France
- Region: Normandy
- Department: Seine-Maritime
- Arrondissement: Le Havre
- Canton: Le Havre-2
- Intercommunality: Le Havre Seine Métropole

Government
  - Mayor (2020–2026): Christine Morel
- Area^{1}: 4.21 km^{2} (1.63 sq mi)
- Elevation: 6 m (20 ft)
- Highest elevation: 89 m (292 ft)
- Lowest elevation: 0 m (0 ft)
- Population (2023): 8,289
  - Density: 1,970/km^{2} (5,100/sq mi)
- Time zone: UTC+01:00 (CET)
  - Summer (DST): UTC+02:00 (CEST)
- INSEE/Postal code: 76341 /76700
- ^{1} French Land Register data, which excludes lakes, ponds, glaciers > 1 km^{2} (0.386 sq mi or 247 acres) and river estuaries.

Harfleur (pronounced [aʁflœʁ]) is a commune in the Seine-Maritime department in the Normandy region of northern France.

It was the principal seaport in north-western France for six centuries, until Le Havre was built about five kilometres (three miles) downstream in the sixteenth century to take advantage of anchorages less prone to siltation. Harfleur is now on the eastern edge of Le Havre's urban area.

== Geography ==
A light industrial town situated in the Pays de Caux by the banks of the Seine and Lézarde rivers, some 6 miles (10 km) east of Le Havre, at the junction of the N282, D231 and D6015 roads. Harfleur station has rail connections to Fécamp and Le Havre.

== History ==
In Roman times, Harfleur was known as Caracotinum, the principal port of the ancient Calates. A Roman road led from Harfleur to Troyes. Another road that disappeared during the Hundred Years War linked Harfleur to Fécamp.

Several Merovingian sarcophagi have been unearthed at the foot of Mount Cabert.

In the Middle Ages, the town's name, Herosfloth, Harofluet or Hareflot, was still sufficiently uncorrupted to indicate its Norman origins. The suffix fleur comes from Old Norse Flöthe meaning "estuary or arm of the sea". The precise meaning of the prefix "har" is unknown.

- 1202 saw the granting of a town charter by King John of England.
- In 1281 the expansion of the port of Harfleur began.
- At the beginning of the 14th century, Harfleur saw the setting-up of a Spanish (from the Aragonese Crown) and Portuguese merchants association.
- 1341–1361 saw the building of the city walls, pierced by three gates (Porte d'Eure, Porte de Rouen and Montivilliers Gate). These were restored in the 15th century after the destruction caused during the Hundred Years War.

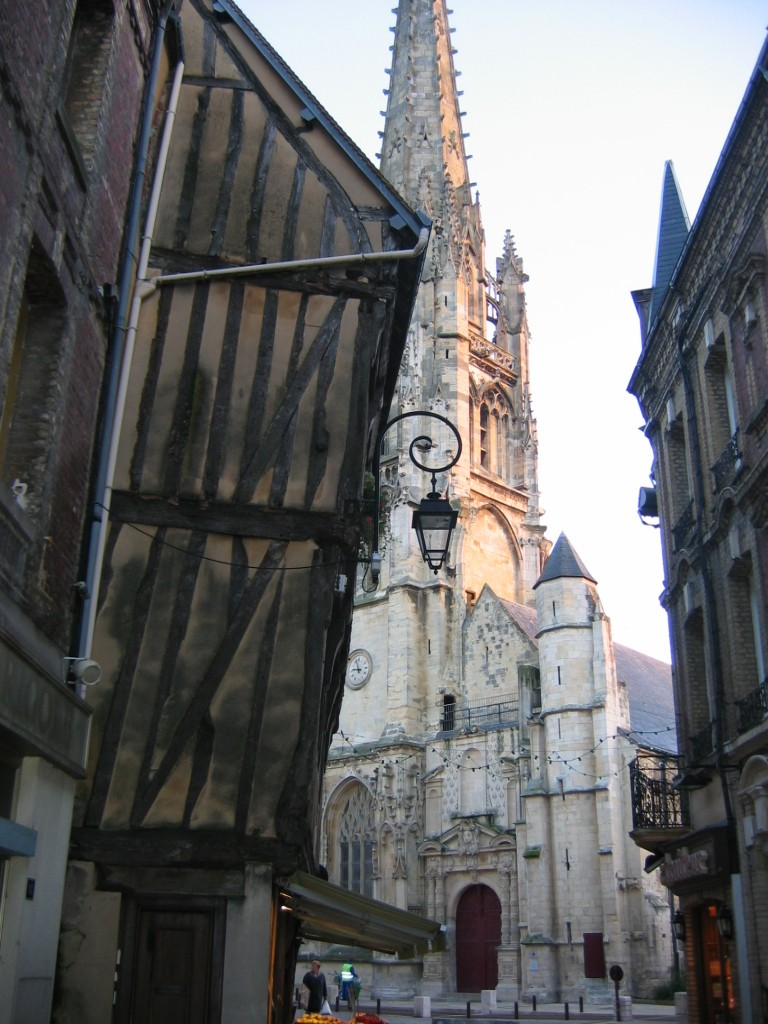
The church and some timber-framed houses

For six centuries, Harfleur was the principal seaport of north-western France. In 1415, it was captured by Henry V of England, an event explicitly mentioned in a popular song of the day, the Agincourt Carol. Sir John Fastolf of Caister Castle Norfolk (1380–1459) later claimed to have been 'the first man over the side' of the boat when the English landed outside the town; and he certainly played a part in the siege, being invalided home afterwards. The Siege of Harfleur lasted some weeks longer than Henry V had anticipated; that was not helped by the outbreak of dysentery which afflicted and killed soldiers, knights, and nobles, with many of the sick having to be transported back to England. The town's defences were badly damaged by the siege warfare, as were many of the principal buildings of the town. In order to consolidate his victory, Henry was forced to leave a significant part of his army as a garrison for the newly captured town. While Henry's intentions after the end of the siege are unclear, he had clearly entered France with an army large enough to engage the French in open battle and not merely to lay siege to one town. Henry left Harfleur, but he found his path to Calais blocked by a French army forcing him inland. The French cut off the English route and confronted them on the muddy fields near Azincourt (not the present-day Agincourt) on Saint Crispin's Day, 25 October 1415. The Battle of Agincourt ended in a decisive English victory with minimal losses - only in the hundreds - and a crushing defeat for the French with losses nearing the tens of thousands.

In 1435, the people of the district of Caux, led by Jean de Grouchy, rose against the English. One hundred and four of the inhabitants opened the gates of the town to the insurgents, and forced the English occupiers out. The memory of the deed was long perpetuated by the bells of St. Martin's tolling 104 strokes.

Between 1445 and 1449 the English were again in possession, but the town was recovered for the French by Jean de Dunois in 1450. In 1562, the Huguenots pillaged Harfleur and its registers and charters perished in the confusion, but its privileges were restored by Charles IX of France in 1568. It was not until 1710 that it was subjected to the "taille".

In the 16th century, the port began to dwindle in importance owing to the silting up of the Seine estuary and the rise of Le Havre. In 1887, the Tancarville canal restored waterborne access to the town from both the Seine and Le Havre.

In 1884, Forges et Chantiers de la Méditerranée shipbuilding company constructed an artillery workshop on the land immediately south of the canal, Gustave Canet known for his QF designs worked there. In January 1897 the workshop together with the shipyard's intellectual property related to artillery was bought by Schneider et Cie, who employed Canet and invested a lot of money into developing the facility into a full-scale plant with a large testing range that could be used for firing at both sea and land targets, and also built Mayville town north of the canal for the workers. In 1937 it was nationalized by the left government of Popular Front and later existed as Ateliers de construction du Havre de la Compagnie normande de mécanique de précision (AHE/CNMP), producing e. g. Panhard AML armoured cars. In 1963 it was subordinated to SNECMA, which redirected the efforts to aerospace industry. Now the location hosts a Safran Nacelles plant.

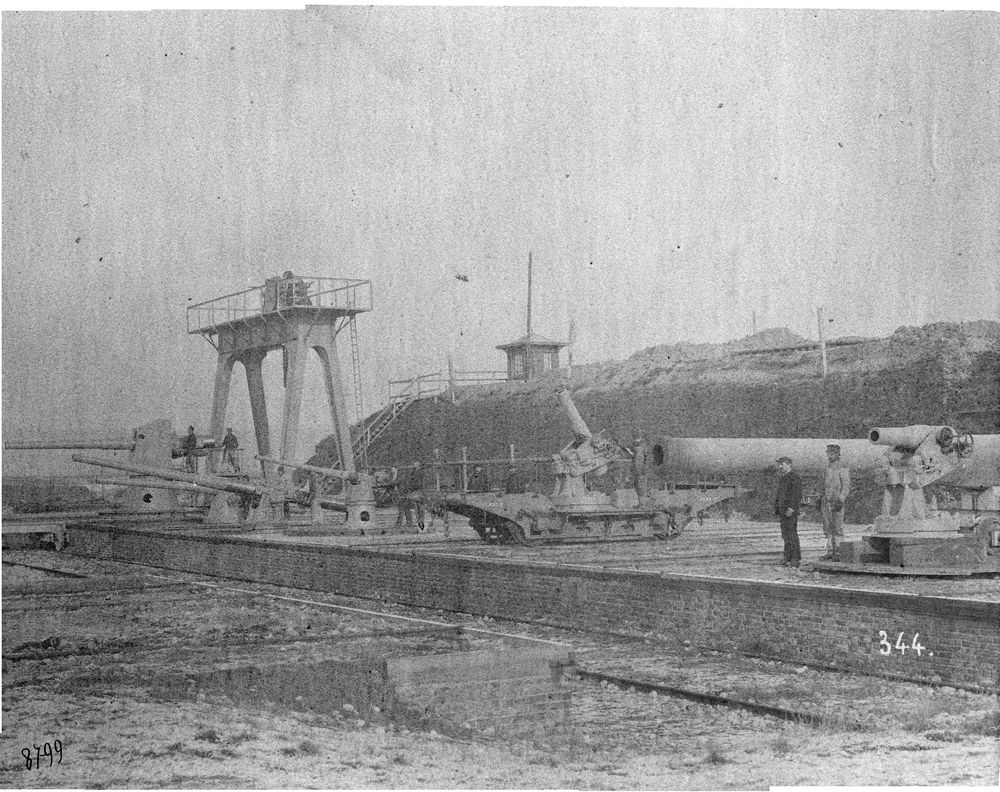
Part of the testing range for firing Canet guns at sea near cape Point du Hoc, early 1890s (under FCM)

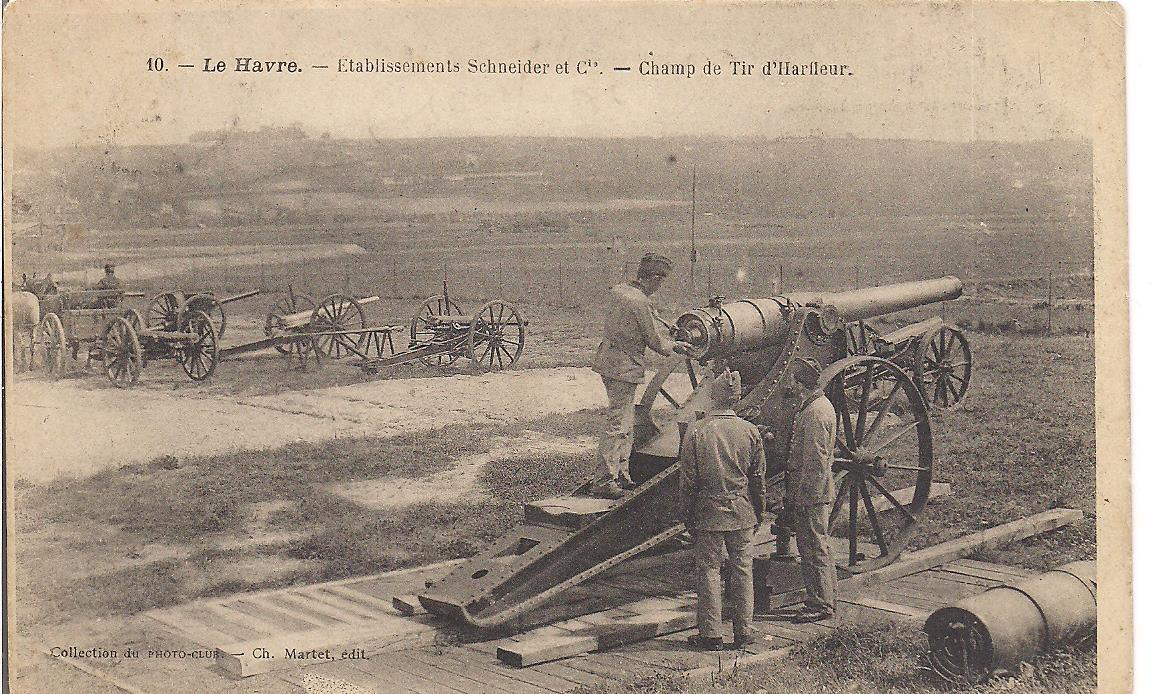
Harfleur testing range with different Canet guns, late 1890s (under Schneider)

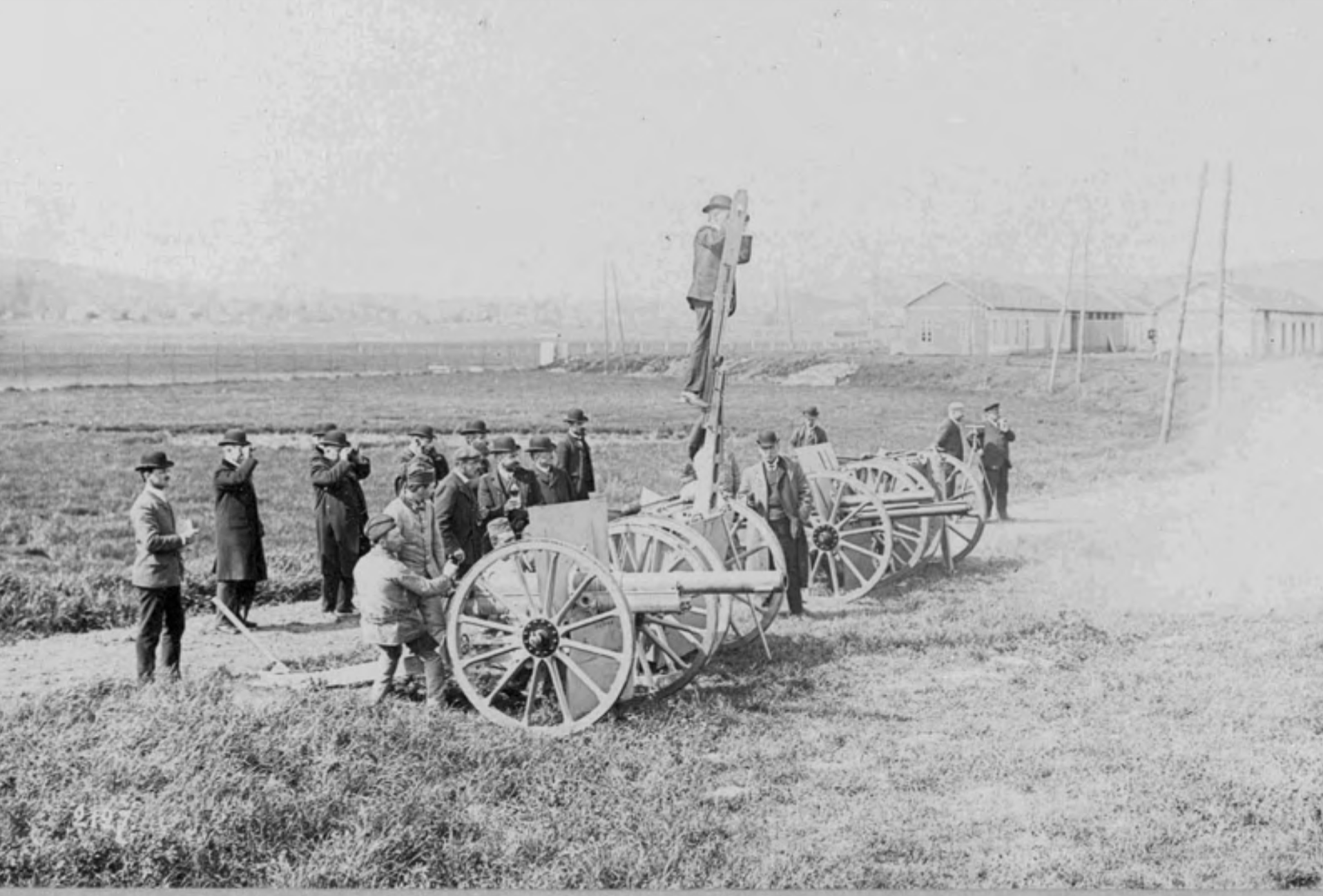
Spanish commission examining 2 different 75-mm light field guns on the Harfleur range, 1904

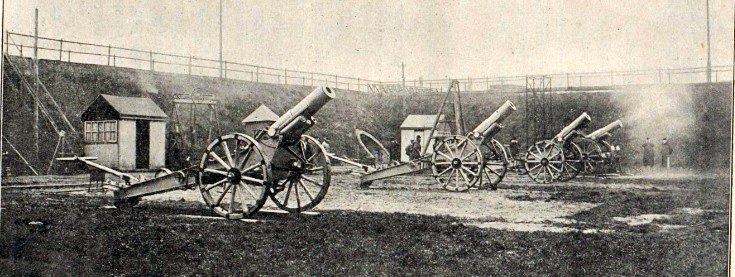
Portuguese 150-mm howitzers in a different location on the same testing range, 1900s

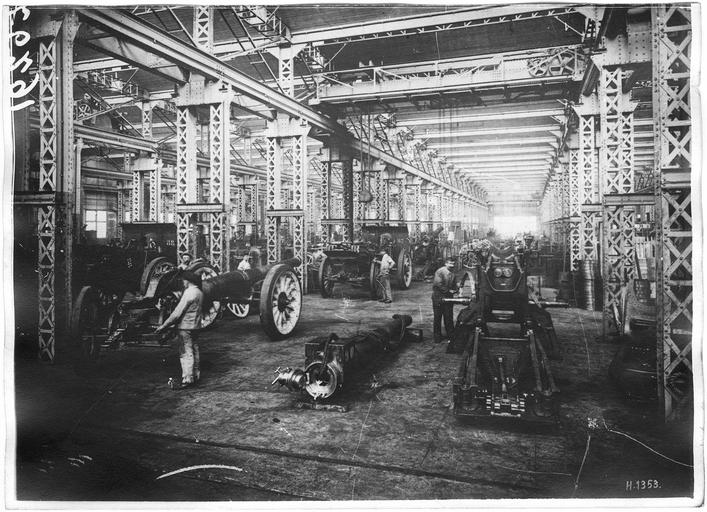
Canon de 155 L modèle 1877/14 Schneider guns assembled at Harfleur, 1916

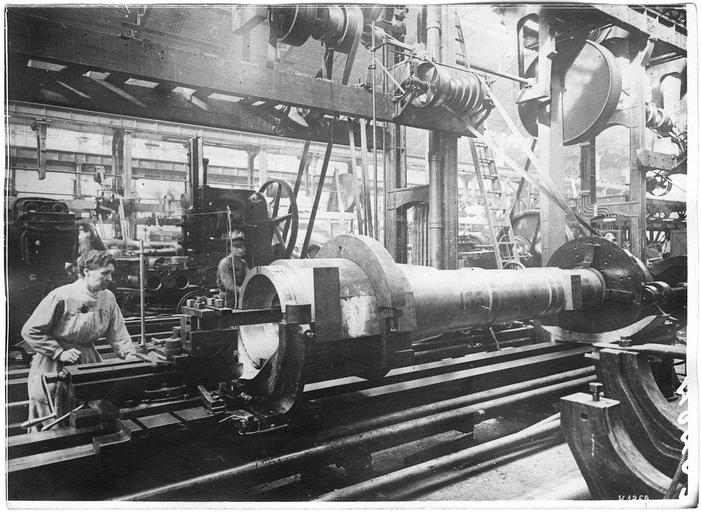
A female worker turning a barrel for a 280-mm howitzer Mle 1914 at the Harfleur plant, 1916

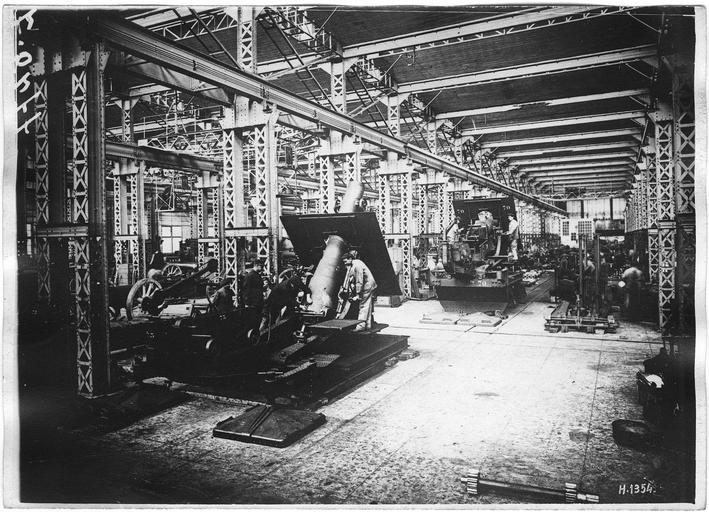
Same howitzers being assembled, 1916

After the Armistice following World War I, a huge hutted camp was established at Harfleur as a basis for dealing with the transit of thousands of troops being demobilised. The British soldier Arthur Bullock recorded in his memoir what life was like there, together with a humorous illustration of his Nissen hut, labelled 'Home Sweet Home'.

=== Heraldry ===
arms of Harfleur	the arms of Harfleur are blazoned : Azur, on a sea, a ship with three masts argent.

== Population ==
Historical population
Year	Pop.	±% p.a.
1968	9,872	—
1975	10,102	+0.33%
1982	9,703	−0.57%
1990	9,180	−0.69%
1999	8,517	−0.83%
2007	8,124	−0.59%
2012	8,202	+0.19%
2017	8,449	+0.60%
2023	8,289	−0.32%
Source: INSEE

== Places of interest ==
- The church of St-Martin, dating from the fourteenth century.
- The seventeenth century Hôtel de Ville (town hall).
- Medieval ramparts (1350–1390)
- The fifteenth century museums of fishing and of archaeology and history.
- Statue of Jean de Grouchy (1875), leader of the forces who liberated Harfleur from the English in 1435.

== Notable people ==
- David Auradou, rugby player
- Khoudjiedji Ba handball player
- Vikash Dhorasoo, footballer
- Florent Hanin, footballer (born 1990)
- Charles N'Zogbia, footballer
- Yvonne Odic, mechanical engineer

== In literature ==
The siege and conquest of Harfleur is described in Act III, Scenes I though III of Shakespeare's Henry V.

The 2009 novel Azincourt (U.S. title Agincourt) by Bernard Cornwell describes the siege and the conquest of Harfleur by the army of Henry V of England in 1415.

The 2003 novel A Hail of Arrows by Michael Cox describes the siege and conquest of Harfleur by the army of Henry V of England in 1415 as witnessed by a 14-year-old boy-archer. Its describes illness and food shortage inflicted by the English army. It goes on to describe the battle of Agincourt.

The poem "Demain, dès l'aube", by Victor Hugo, alludes to "the distant sails descending towards Harfleur" ("les voiles au loin descendant vers Harfleur").

== See also ==
- Communes of the Seine-Maritime department

== Bibliography and links ==
- Bullock, A S, Gloucestershire Between the Wars: A Memoir, The History Press, 2009
- Cooper, S, The Real Falstaff, Sir John Fastolf and the Hundred Years War, Pen & Sword, 2010
