= Morgny station =

Railway station in Morgny-la-Pommeraye, France

Morgny
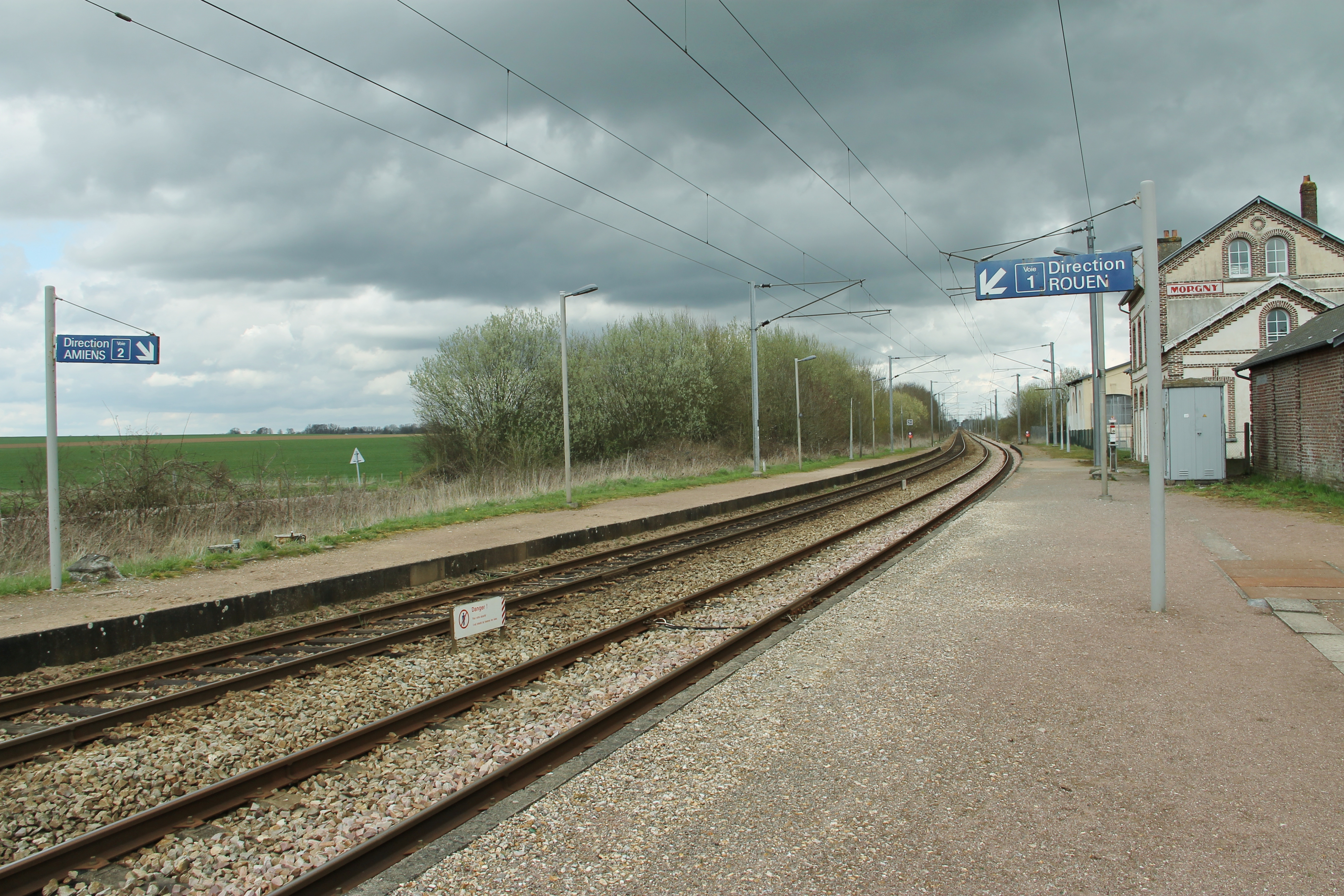

General information
- Location: Morgny-la-Pommeraye
- Coordinates: 49°31′24″N 1°14′52″E
- Owner: RFF/SNCF
- Line: Amiens–Rouen railway
- Platforms: 2
- Tracks: 2

Other information
- Station code: 87411439

Services
Preceding station	TER Hauts-de-France	Following station
Montérolier–Buchy towards Lille-Flandres	Krono K45	Rouen-RD Terminus
Longuerue–Vieux-Manoir towards Amiens	Proxi P45	Rouen-RD Terminus
Location

The Gare de Morgny (Morgny station) is a railway station in the commune of Morgny-la-Pommeraye in the Seine-Maritime department, France. The station is served by TER Normandie and TER Hauts-de-France trains from Amiens to Rouen.
