= Longuerue–Vieux-Manoir station =

Railway station in Vieux-Manoir, France

Longuerue–Vieux-Manoir
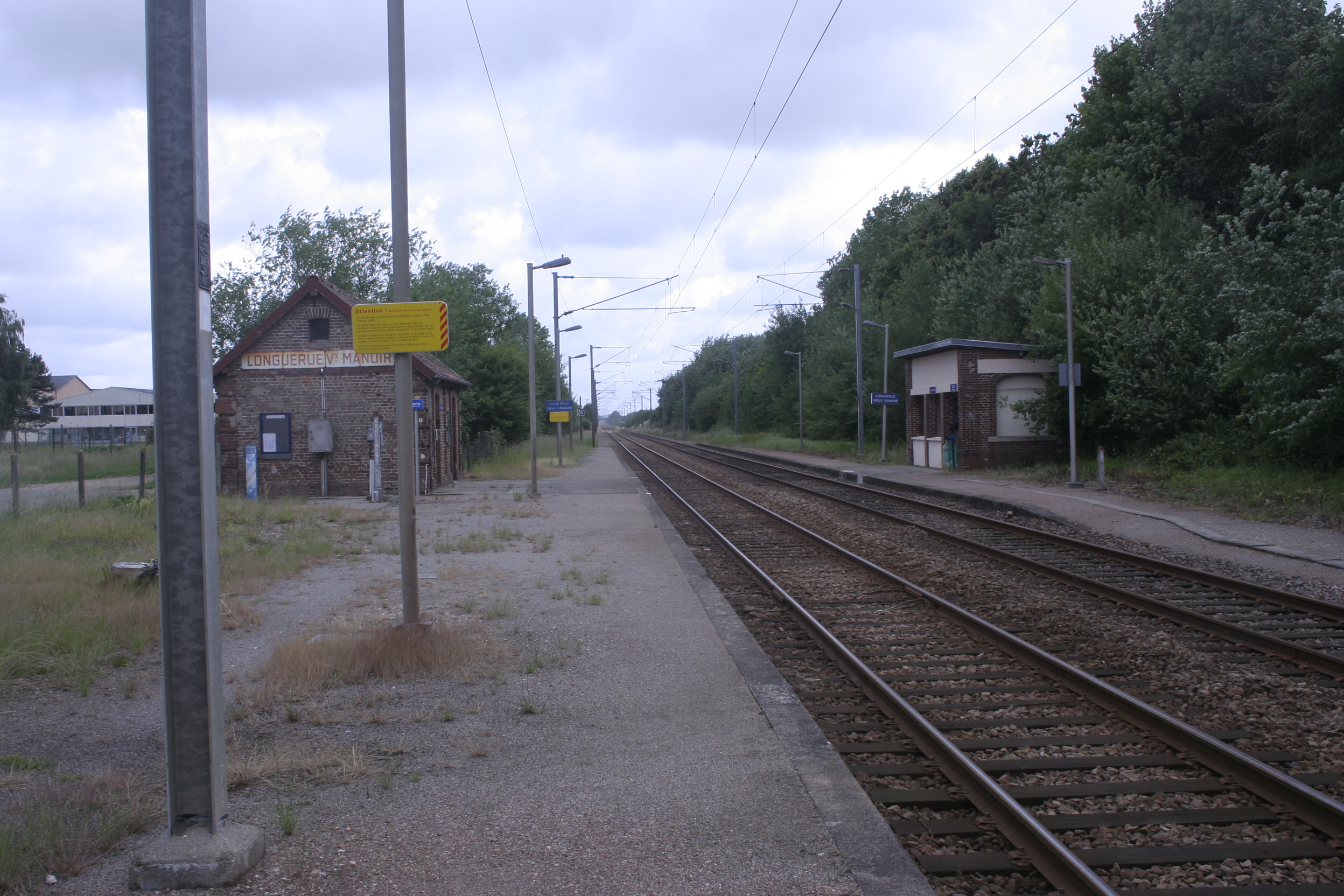
- Longuerue-Vieux-Manoir railway station

General information
- Location: Vieux-Manoir
- Coordinates: 49°33′24″N 1°16′35″E
- Owner: RFF/SNCF
- Line: Amiens–Rouen railway
- Platforms: 2
- Tracks: 2

Other information
- Station code: 87411447

Services
Preceding station	TER Hauts-de-France	Following station
Montérolier–Buchy towards Amiens	Proxi P45	Morgny towards Rouen-RD
Location

The Gare de Longuerue–Vieux-Manoir (Longuerue–Vieux-Manoir station) is a railway station in the commune of Vieux-Manoir in the Seine-Maritime department, France, near Longuerue. The station is served by TER Normandie and TER Hauts-de-France trains from Amiens to Rouen.
