= Sidonius (Irish saint) =

Medieval Irish and French saint

Sidonius (French: Saëns or Sidoine; Irish: Séadna) was an Irish-born French monk and saint. He was the spiritual teacher of Leutfridus. He is venerated in the Roman Catholic Church and Eastern Orthodox Church.

Sidonius was born sometime in the seventh century AD, and was a monk at Jumièges Abbey in 664; he then spent several years travelling between monasteries. For ten years he served in Rome as a companion to Ouen, eventually being sent to lead a monastery near Rouen. This monastery, known in his honour as Saint-Saëns, survived until the ninth century. Sidonius founded several other monasteries in the area before retiring to live as a monk.

Sidonius died around 690; his feast day is November 14.
