= Montérolier–Buchy station =

French railway station

Montérolier–Buchy
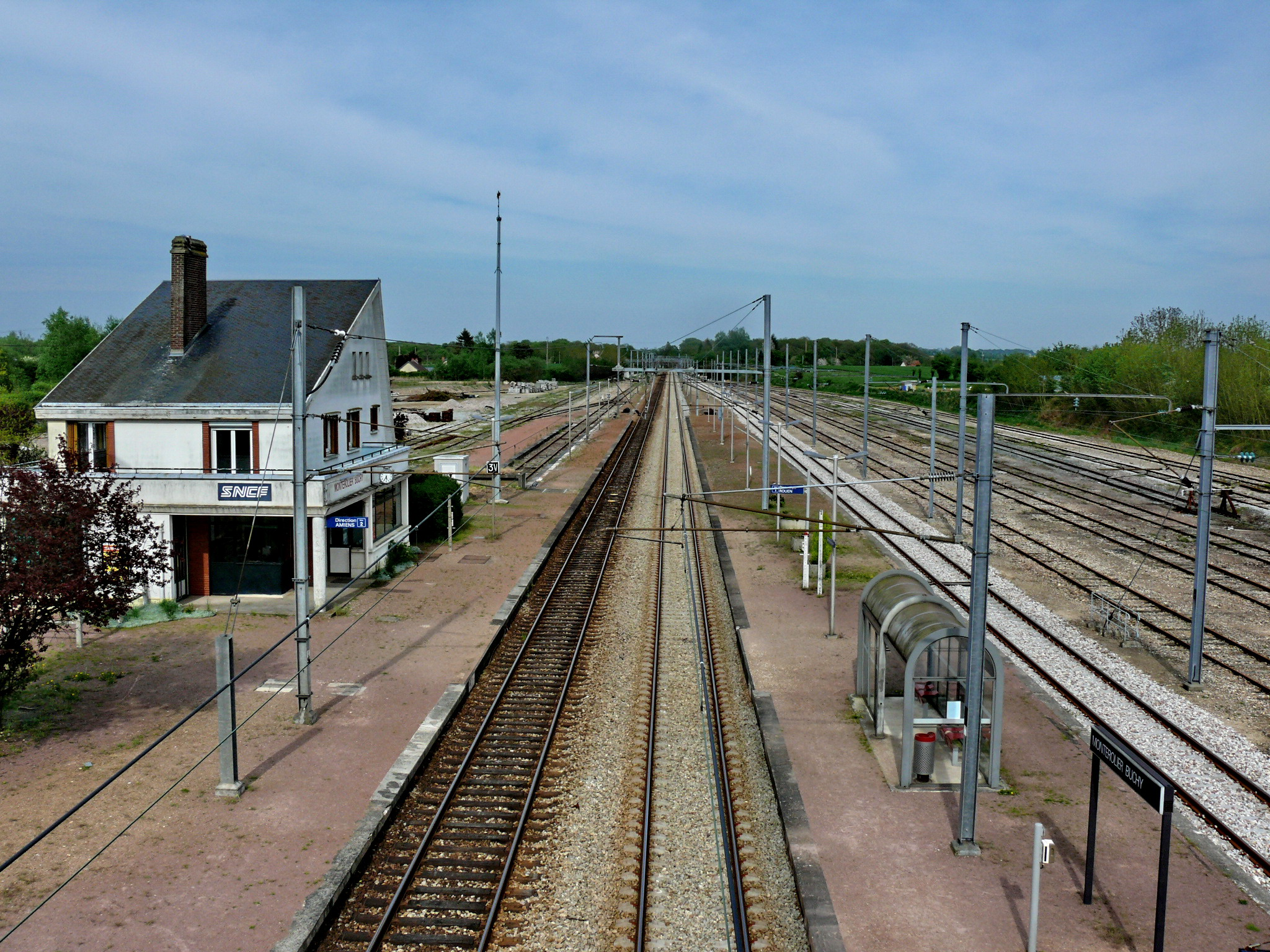
- View of the station from the tracks

General information
- Location: Montérolier
- Coordinates: 49°36′11″N 1°20′4″E
- Owner: RFF/SNCF
- Line: Amiens–Rouen railway
- Platforms: 2
- Tracks: 2 + sidings

Other information
- Station code: 87411454

Services
Preceding station	TER Hauts-de-France	Following station
Serqueux towards Lille-Flandres	Krono K45	Morgny towards Rouen-RD
Sommery towards Amiens	Proxi P45	Longuerue–Vieux-Manoir towards Rouen-RD
Location

The Gare de Montérolier–Buchy (Montérolier-Buchy station) is a railway station in the commune of Montérolier in the Seine-Maritime department, France and near Buchy. The station is a stop on the Amiens–Rouen railway, and is the terminus a line to Motteville. It was also the terminus of the branch line to Saint-Saëns, which has been closed and removed.

== The station ==
Montérolier-Buchy is now an unstaffed station. It has two platforms on either side of two passenger tracks, between which there is a metal footbridge (not handicap-accessible). Numerous sidings lie to the south of the station.

The station is served by TER Normandie and TER Hauts-de-France trains from Rouen to Amiens and Lille. In summer it is also served by TER Haute-Normandie trains linking Rouen to Le Tréport-Mers.

== Connections ==
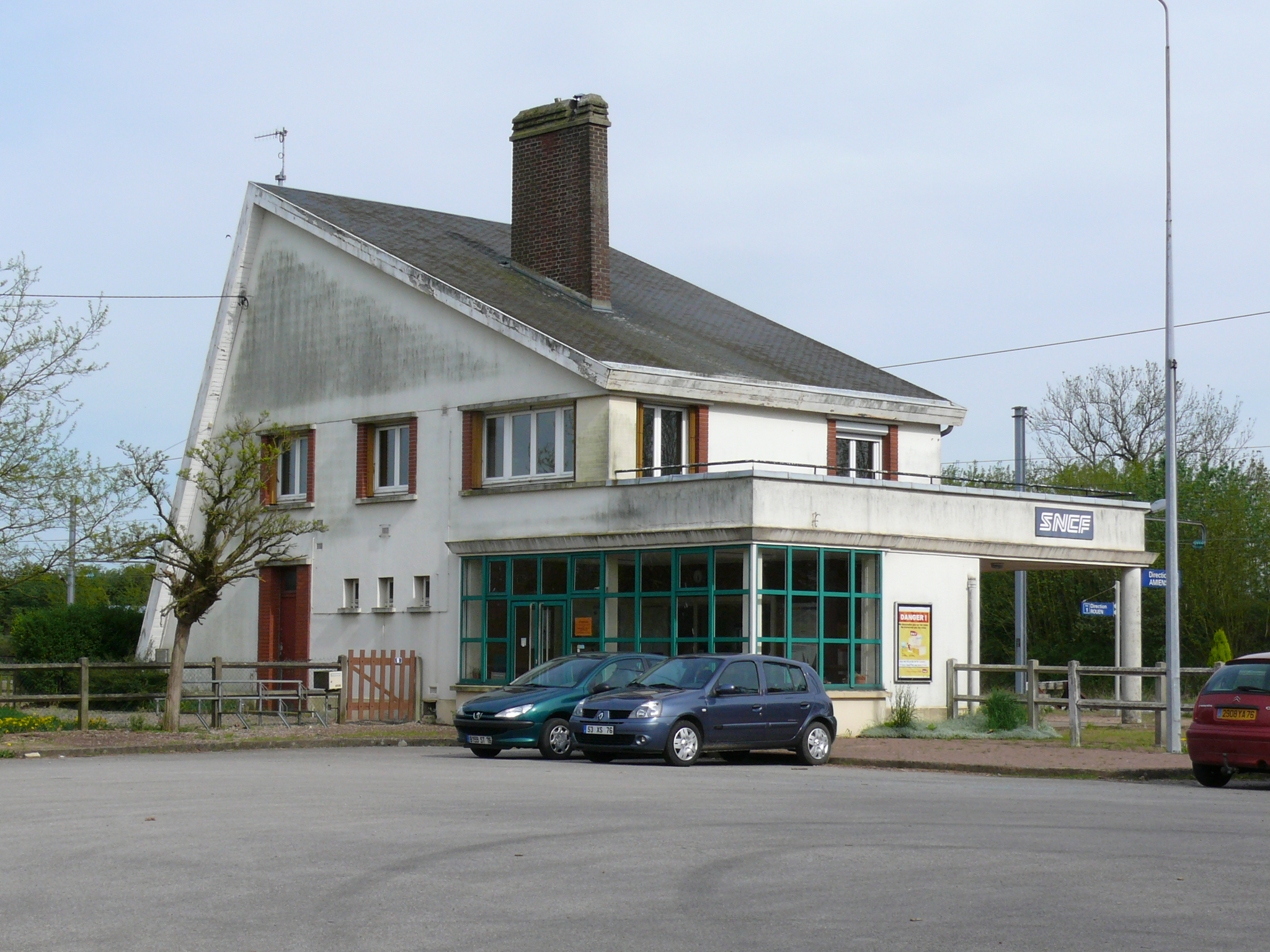
The station building still exists but is not open to the public

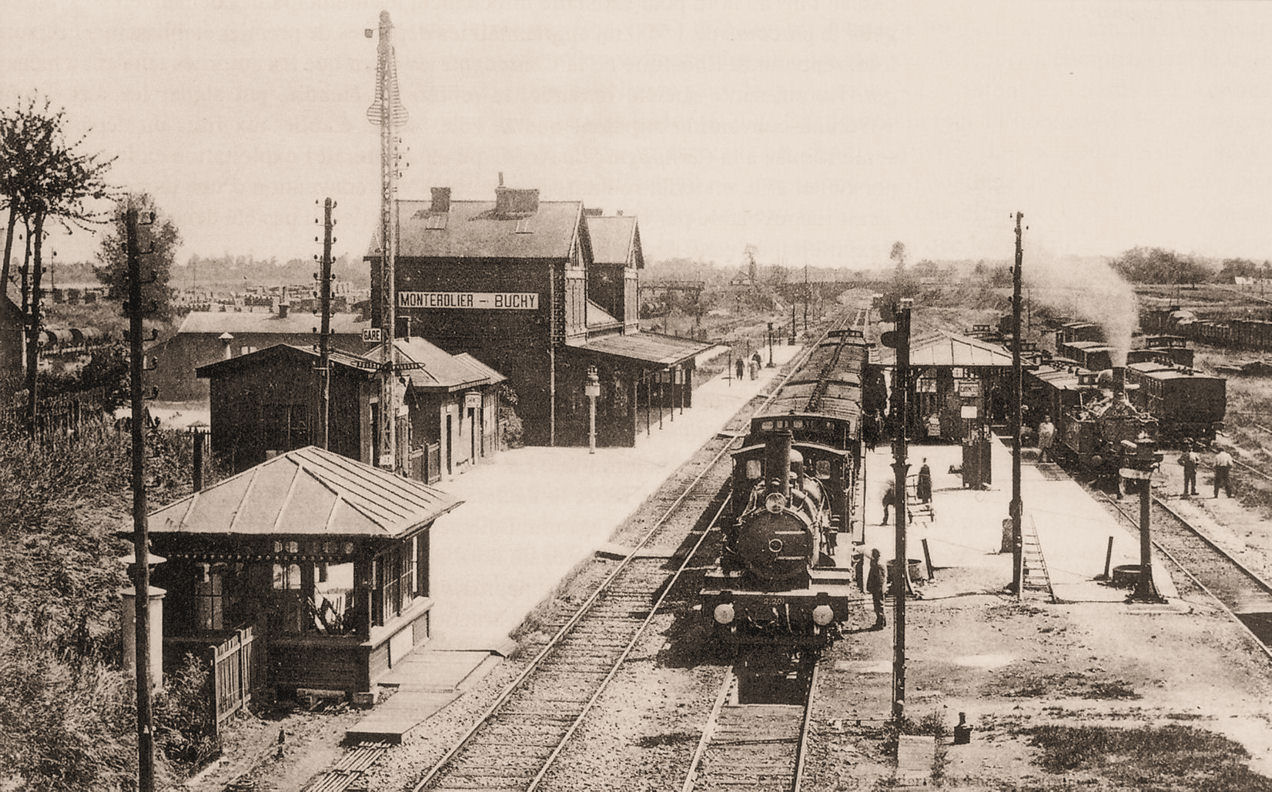
The station at the beginning of the 20th century

Montérolier-Buchy is the terminus for two branch lines:

- To Saint-Saëns: a 10.2 km shuttle local line closed in 1953 and since dismantled.
- To Motteville (freight only)

== History ==
The station was heavily bombed during the Second World War, because it controlled a junction and the Amiens–Rouen line was of great importance to the German Army.

A plaque placed on the station forecourt commemorates the existence there from April to June 1945 of a reception station for deportees, prisoners and returning French obligatory workers being repatriated from Nazi Germany.

== See also ==
- List of SNCF stations in Normandy
