= Vieux-Manoir =

- Commune
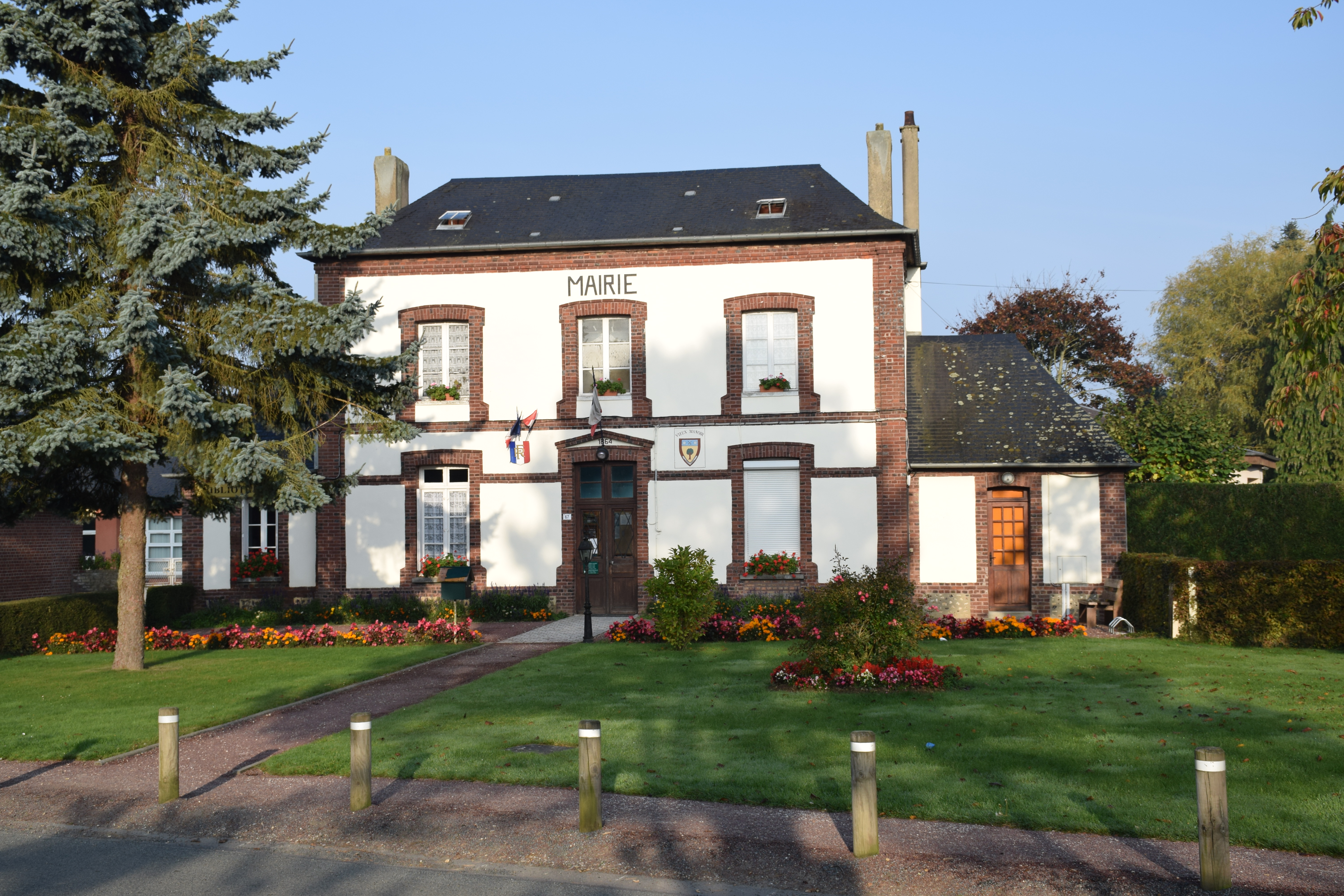
- The town hall in Vieux-Manoir

- Coat of arms
- Location of Vieux-Manoir
- Location within France Location within Normandy
- Coordinates: 49°34′04″N 1°17′55″E
- Country: France
- Region: Normandy
- Department: Seine-Maritime
- Arrondissement: Rouen
- Canton: Le Mesnil-Esnard

Government
  - Mayor (2020–2026): Fabrice Otero
- Area^{1}: 8.13 km^{2} (3.14 sq mi)
- Elevation: 173 m (568 ft)
- Highest elevation: 189 m (620 ft)
- Lowest elevation: 143 m (469 ft)
- Population (2023): 772
  - Density: 95.0/km^{2} (246/sq mi)
- Time zone: UTC+01:00 (CET)
  - Summer (DST): UTC+02:00 (CEST)
- INSEE/Postal code: 76738 /76750
- ^{1} French Land Register data, which excludes lakes, ponds, glaciers > 1 km^{2} (0.386 sq mi or 247 acres) and river estuaries.

Vieux-Manoir (French pronunciation: [vjø manwaʁ]) is a commune in the Seine-Maritime department in the Normandy region in northern France.

== Geography ==
A village of farming and associated light industry situated in the Pays de Bray, some 15 miles (24 km) northeast of Rouen near the junction of the D206 with the D122 road. The A28 autoroute forms the western border of the commune. Longuerue-Vieux-Manoir station has rail connections to Rouen and Amiens.

== Population ==
Historical population
Year	Pop.	±% p.a.
1968	280	—
1975	340	+2.81%
1982	609	+8.68%
1990	599	−0.21%
1999	650	+0.91%
2007	684	+0.64%
2012	693	+0.26%
2017	736	+1.21%
2023	772	+0.80%
Source: INSEE

== Places of interest ==
- The church of Notre-Dame, dating from the sixteenth century.

== See also ==
- Communes of the Seine-Maritime department
