= Peigné-Canet-Schneider mle 1897 gun carriage =

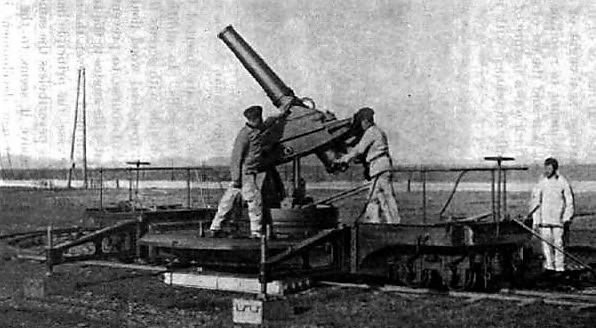
- An Obusier de 155 C mle 1881 sur affût-truc Peigné-Canet-Schneider mle 1897.
- Type: Railway gun Siege gun
- Place of origin: France

Service history
- In service: 1897-1919
- Used by: France; United States
- Wars: World War I

Production history
- Designer: Guns: Colonel Charles Ragon de Bange; Carriage: Lieutenant Colonel Christophe Peigné and Gustave Canet
- Manufacturer: Guns: Atelier de précision Paris; Carriage: Schneider-Creusot
- Produced: 1897
- No. built: 48
- Variants: 120 mm and 155 mm

Specifications
- Mass: ?
- Barrel length: 120 mm: 3.25 m (10 ft 8 in) L/27; 155 mm: 2.4 m (7 ft 10 in) L/15.5
- Shell: Separate-loading, bagged charges, and projectiles
- Shell weight: 120 mm: 18–25 kg (40–55 lb); 155 mm: 40–43 kg (88–95 lb)
- Caliber: 120 mm (4.7 in); 155 mm (6.1 in)
- Breech: de Bange
- Recoil: Top-carriage recoil
- Carriage: Top carriage traverse 2-axle of 4-axle narrow gauge carriage
- Elevation: ?
- Traverse: 360°
- Muzzle velocity: 120 mm: 525 m/s (1,720 ft/s); 155 mm: 303 m/s (990 ft/s)
- Maximum firing range: 120 mm: 8–10 km (5–6 mi); 155 mm: 6.8 km (4 mi)

The Peigné-Canet-Schneider mle 1897 gun carriage was a railway gun carriage designed and built during the late 1800s. Two types of guns were mounted on these carriages and both the French Army and US Army used them during World War I. They were retired soon after World War I.

== History ==
Although the majority of combatants had heavy field artillery before the outbreak of the First World War, none had adequate numbers of heavy guns in service, nor had they foreseen the growing importance of heavy artillery once the Western Front stagnated and trench warfare set in. Since aircraft of the period were not yet capable of carrying large-diameter bombs the burden of delivering heavy firepower fell on the artillery.

Large-caliber field guns often required extensive site preparation because the guns had to be broken down into multiple loads light enough to be towed by a horse team or the few traction engines of the time and then reassembled before use. Building a new gun could address the problem of disassembling, transporting, and reassembling a large gun, but it didn't necessarily address how to convert existing heavy weapons to make them more mobile. Rail transport proved to be the most practical solution because the problems of heavy weight, lack of mobility, and reduced setup time were addressed.

== Design ==
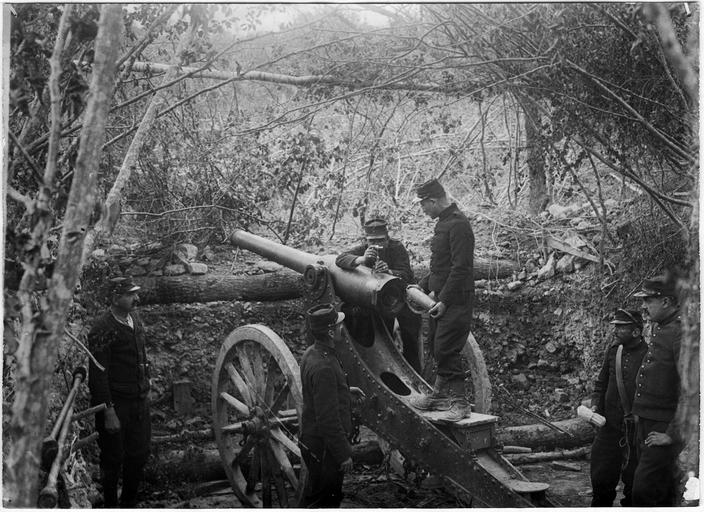
A mle 1878 in action. Note the tall and narrow carriage.

=== Cannon de 120 mm L mle 1878 ===
The mle 1878 was a breech-loaded siege gun with a de Bange obturator that used separate loading bagged charges and projectiles. It had a box trail carriage, no gun shield, two wooden-spoked steel-rimmed wheels, unsprung axle, and no recoil mechanism.

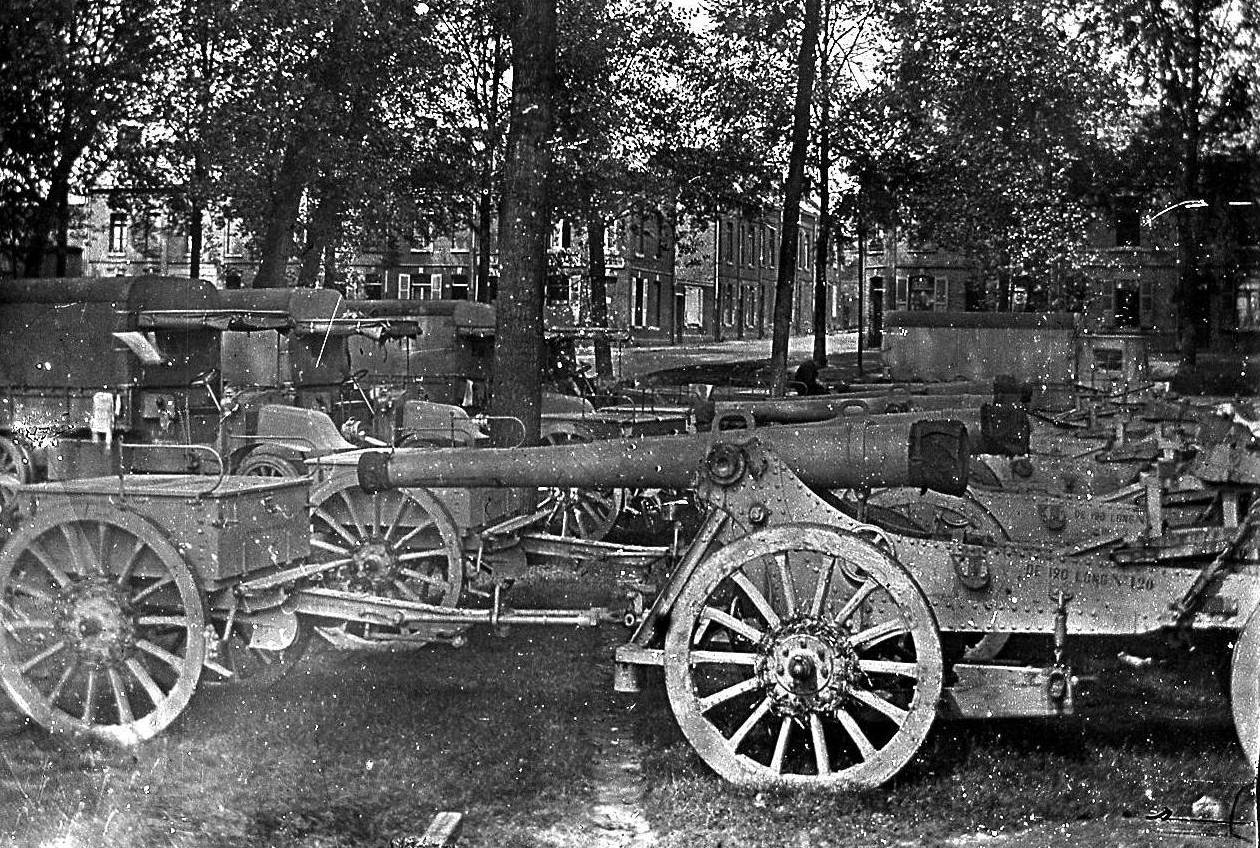
A mle 1878 attached to its limber for transport.

The 120 mm L mle 1878 was classified as a siege et de place (stationary siege gun) in France's Séré de Rivières system of fortifications. In line with this mission, the carriage was tall because it was expected that its barrel would overhang a parapet and provide long-range, low-angle, counter-battery fire against enemy artillery.

A drawback of the gun was that it required considerable time to prepare a firing platform made of concrete or timbers before use. An external recoil cylinder could then be bolted to the platform and connected to an eyelet on the bottom of the gun carriage. Without it, the gun had no recoil mechanism and when fired the gun rolled back onto a set of ramps behind the wheels and then slid back into position. Since it lacked a recoil mechanism it had to be levered into position and re-aimed after every shot, which was strenuous, time-consuming, and limited its rate of fire.

For transport, the tail of the carriage was hooked to a limber and caisson for horse towing. It was found it had a tendency to sink in on soft ground and since it wasn't designed to be pulled by motor traction its wooden-spoked, steel-rimmed wheels, and axle were too fragile to be towed at high speed.

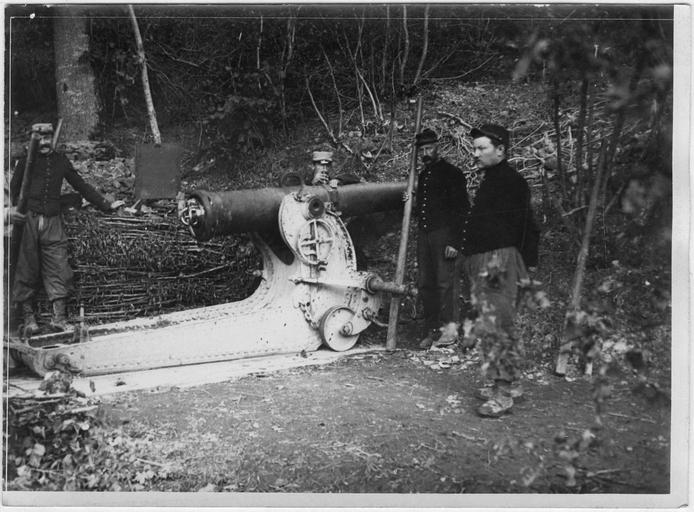
A mle 1881.

=== Obusier de 155 C mle 1881 ===
Unlike the earlier Canon de 120 mm L mle 1878 the mle 1881 was designed to provide short-range, high-angle fire instead of long-range, low-angle fire. This high-angle fire would be used to engage an enemy laying siege to French fortifications by dropping a large caliber shell into their assault trenches. The mle 1881 used a distinctive looking gooseneck shaped box trail carriage and was a breech-loaded howitzer with a steel barrel and a de Bange obturator that used separate loading bagged charges and projectiles. The mle 1881 was originally built without a recoil mechanism and to traverse it needed to be levered into position before each shot limiting the rate of fire. For transport, the mle 1881 could be fitted with a set of removable wooden-spoked, steel-rimmed wheels at the front of the carriage. The tail of the carriage was then hooked to a limber and caisson for horse towing. Site preparation included creating a 5.3 m (17 ft) firing platform made of wooden beams which took 2.5 hours to build.

=== Peigné-Canet-Schneider mle 1897 gun carriage ===
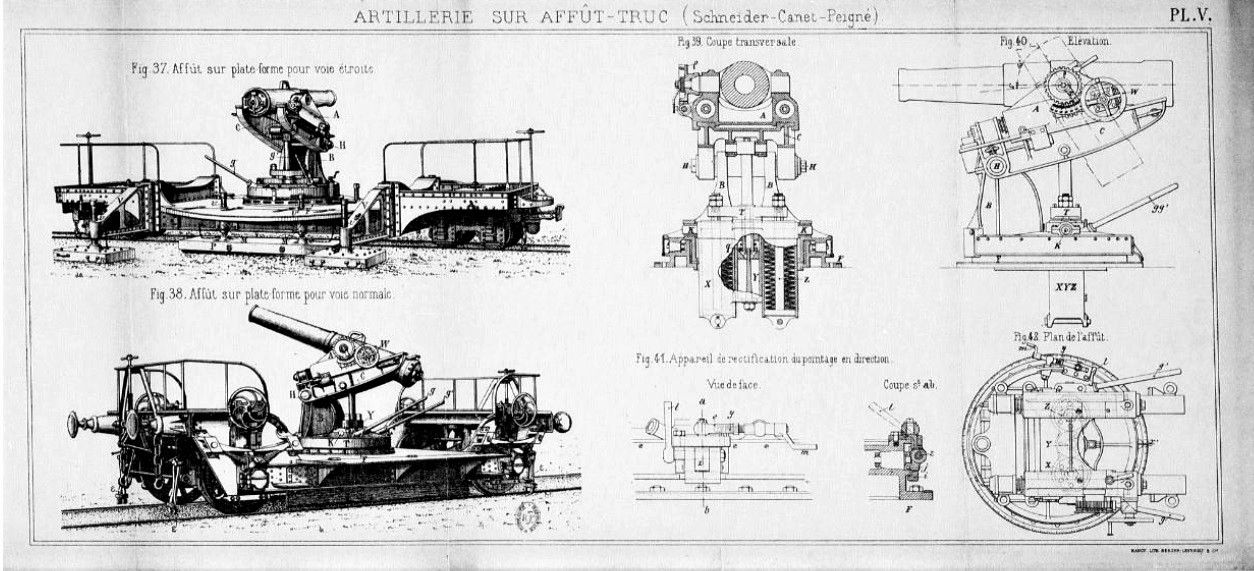
Line drawings from a Schneider sales brochure.

As early as 1888 Lieutenant Colonel Christophe Peigné began working on a proposal to mount artillery on rail carriages for use at the forts of Verdun, Toul, Épinal, and Belfort. By mounting artillery on rail carriages he was attempting to solve several technical problems such as: 1) If the guns of the forts faced the wrong direction an enemy could attack from a direction where defenses were weaker. 2) Since the guns lacked mobility they couldn't be easily redeployed to face an attack from an unexpected direction. 3) Lacking mobility more guns would be needed to defend likely avenues of attack which would be wasteful because some guns would be engaged while others wouldn't. 4) Setup time for the guns needed to be reduced to speed redeployment. 5) If the forts were overrun there wasn't a good way to evacuate the guns and they would be lost to the enemy. 6) Rail transport was the most efficient form of transport available for both the guns and their supplies.

Peigné was assisted by Gustave Canet an artillery engineer who at the time worked for the Forges et Chantiers de la Mediterranee shipbuilding firm but in 1897 moved to Schneider-Creusot company. The Peigné-Canet-Schneider carriages are believed to be the first purpose built railroad guns in Europe, the line drawing is from their sales brochure printed for the 1900 Paris Expo. Russia bought a battery of six 6-inch pieces for tests and evaluations ca. 1890-1894 but abandoned the idea, leaving them as coastal artillery on the westernmost fort Rif in Kronstadt.

Peigné's original proposal was for variable-gauge rail carriages which could run on standard-gauge or narrow-gauge 60 cm (24 in) rails. However, the rail carriages that were built used narrow-gauge rails instead. The conversion of the mle 1878 and mle 1881 involved mounting the guns on twin or four-axle well-base rail carriages. The carriages and mounts were interchangeable and could be used with either gun. By mating the guns and carriages the majority of drawbacks of the guns were addressed. The guns and carriages were given the designation of Canon de 120 L mle 1878 sur affût-truc Peigné-Canet-Schneider mle 1897 and Obusier de 155 C mle 1881 sur affût-truc Peigné-Canet-Schneider mle 1897.

The carriages had folding side panels that created a circular base when unfolded and a combination of jackscrews, outriggers, and rail clamps stabilized the carriage during firing. The gun mount was a type of top-carriage recoil system where the gun sat on a cradle that held the trunnioned barrel on top of an articulated arm. When the gun fired a combination of inclined rails, and hydraulic buffers returned the gun to position. These features allowed 360° of traverse and high angles of elevation for the guns. The new carriages allowed the guns to be quickly re-positioned to different parts of the fort and the rails could also bring up supplies. Each fortress was supposed to have twelve mle 1881 and eight mle 1878 guns but it is believed only 48 of all types were produced because the French Army gave preference to offensive instead of defensive weapons.

== Photo Gallery ==
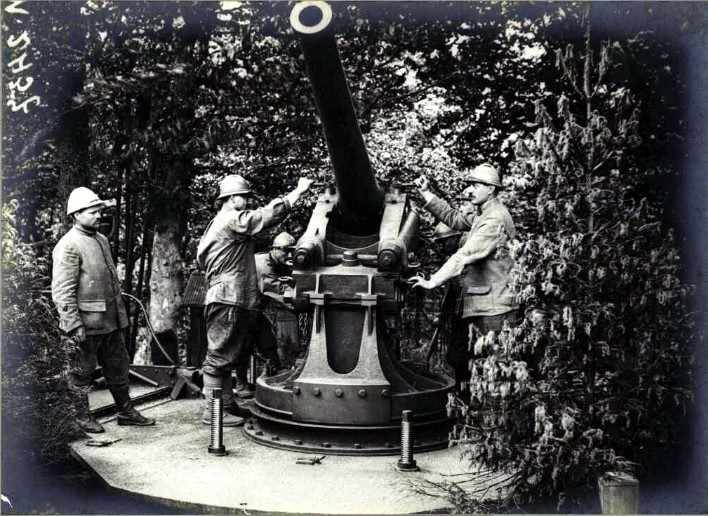
A 155 mm in action near the Vosges mountains.

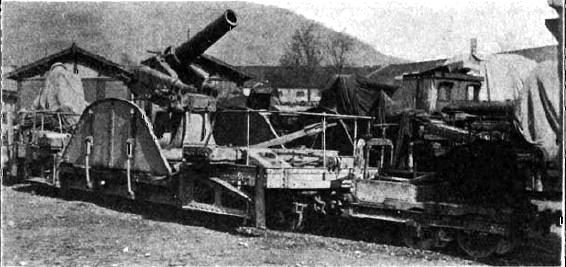
A 155 mm in a US Army depot near Toul.

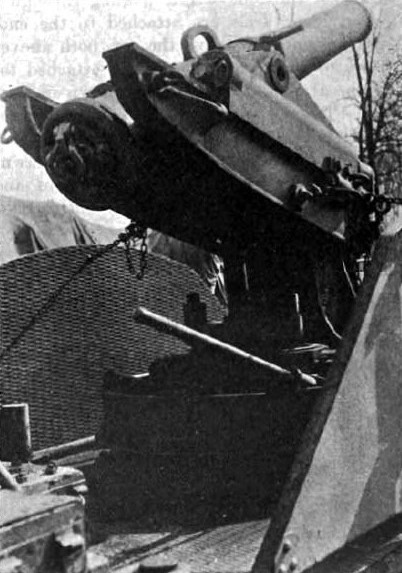
A closeup of the breech and mount of a 155 mm gun.

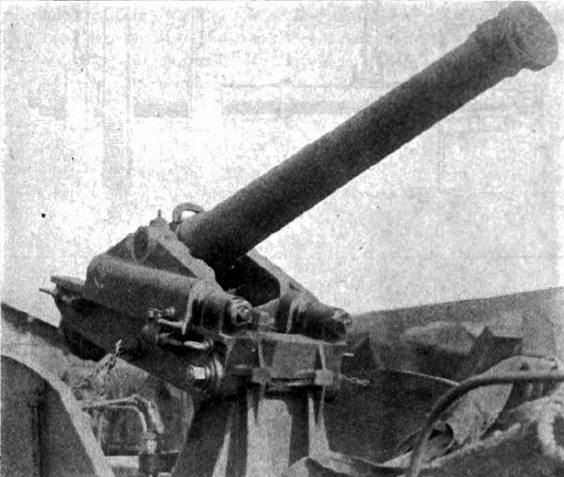
A closeup of a 120 mm gun mount in a US Army depot near Toul.

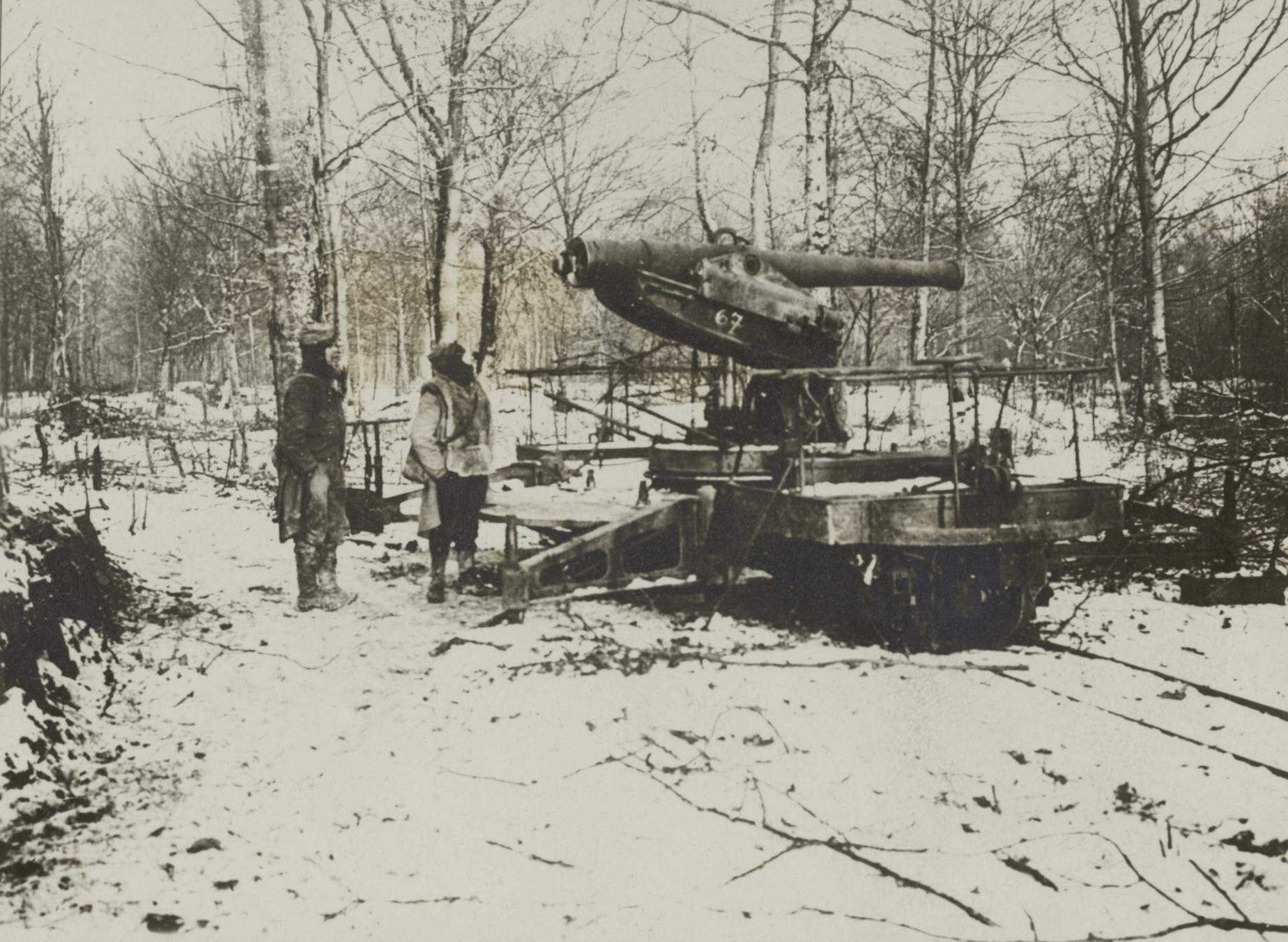
A 120 mm in action near the Argonne Forest.

== See also ==
Obusier de 15 cm TR Schneider-Canet-du-Bocage - The first howitzer system designed for road motor traction.
