= Sommery =

- Commune
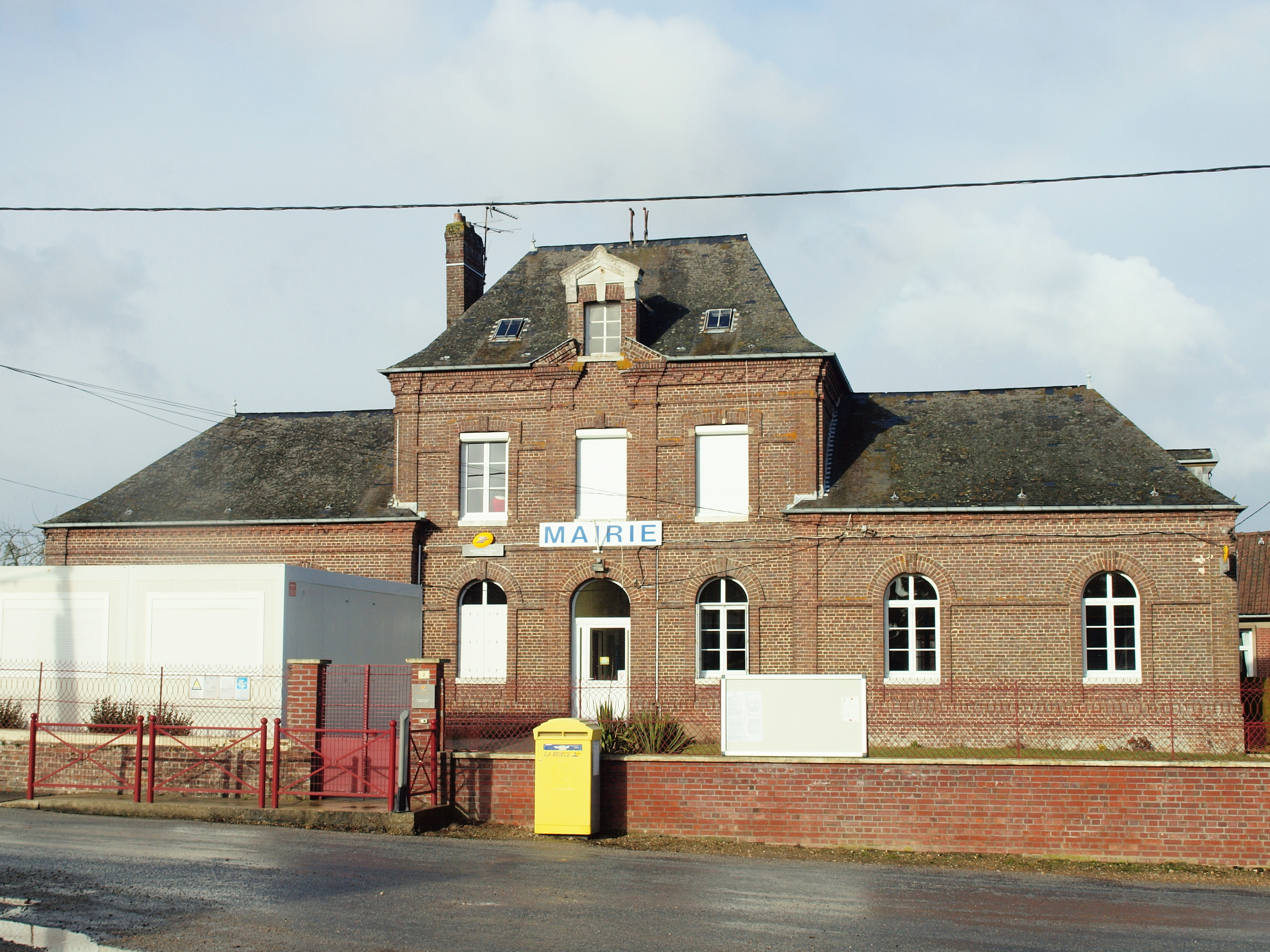
- The town hall in Sommery

- Coat of arms
- Location of Sommery
- Location within France Location within Normandy
- Coordinates: 49°38′07″N 1°26′27″E
- Country: France
- Region: Normandy
- Department: Seine-Maritime
- Arrondissement: Dieppe
- Canton: Neufchâtel-en-Bray
- Intercommunality: CC Bray-Eawy

Government
  - Mayor (2026–32): Marie-France Creton
- Area^{1}: 21.39 km^{2} (8.26 sq mi)
- Elevation: 140 m (460 ft)
- Highest elevation: 236 m (774 ft)
- Lowest elevation: 117 m (384 ft)
- Population (2023): 826
  - Density: 38.6/km^{2} (100/sq mi)
- Time zone: UTC+01:00 (CET)
  - Summer (DST): UTC+02:00 (CEST)
- INSEE/Postal code: 76678 /76440
- ^{1} French Land Register data, which excludes lakes, ponds, glaciers > 1 km^{2} (0.386 sq mi or 247 acres) and river estuaries.

Sommery (French pronunciation: [sɔmʁi]) is a commune in the Seine-Maritime department in the Normandy region in northern France.

== Geography ==
A farming village situated in the Pays de Bray, some 28 miles (45 km) southeast of Dieppe, at the junction of the D915, D1 and D7 roads. Three streams within the commune's territory feed the river Béthune. Sommery station has rail connections to Rouen and Amiens.

== Population ==
Historical population
Year	Pop.	±% p.a.
1968	735	—
1975	665	−1.42%
1982	619	−1.02%
1990	583	−0.75%
1999	645	+1.13%
2007	706	+1.14%
2012	867	+4.19%
2017	809	−1.38%
2023	826	+0.35%
Source: INSEE

== Places of interest ==
- An eighteenth-century cider press at the seventeenth-century Bray farm.
- The church of St. Vaast, dating from the thirteenth century.

== See also ==
- Communes of the Seine-Maritime department
