= Morgny-la-Pommeraye =

- Commune
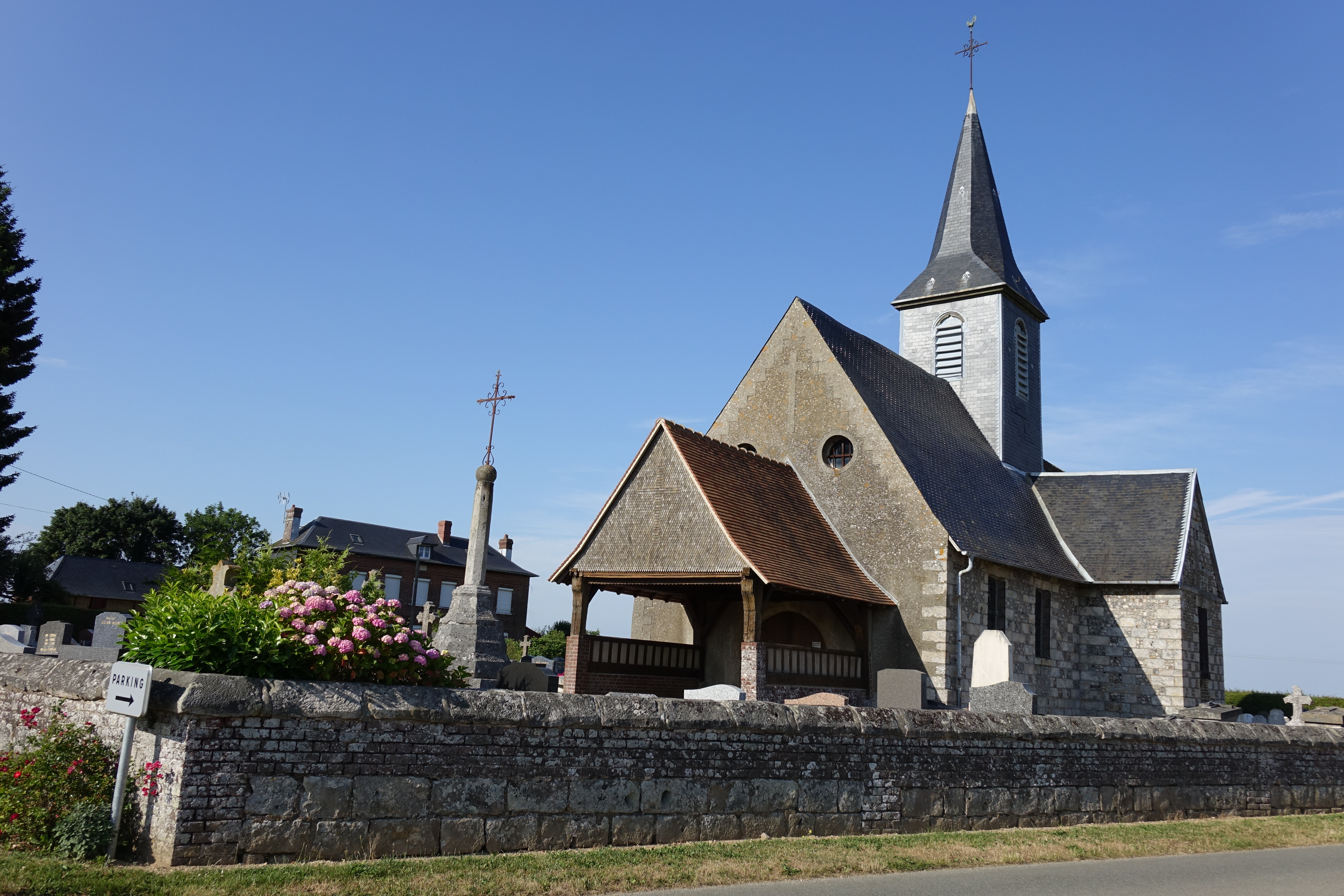
- The church in Morgny-la-Pommeraye

- Coat of arms
- Location of Morgny-la-Pommeraye
- Location within France Location within Normandy
- Coordinates: 49°30′41″N 1°15′21″E
- Country: France
- Region: Normandy
- Department: Seine-Maritime
- Arrondissement: Rouen
- Canton: Le Mesnil-Esnard

Government
  - Mayor (2020–2026): Pascal Sagot
- Area^{1}: 6.48 km^{2} (2.50 sq mi)
- Elevation: 164 m (538 ft)
- Highest elevation: 168 m (551 ft)
- Lowest elevation: 120 m (390 ft)
- Population (2023): 1,065
  - Density: 164/km^{2} (426/sq mi)
- Time zone: UTC+01:00 (CET)
  - Summer (DST): UTC+02:00 (CEST)
- INSEE/Postal code: 76453 /76750
- ^{1} French Land Register data, which excludes lakes, ponds, glaciers > 1 km^{2} (0.386 sq mi or 247 acres) and river estuaries.

Morgny-la-Pommeraye (French pronunciation: [mɔʁɲi la pɔmʁɛ]) is a commune in the Seine-Maritime department in the Normandy region in north-western France.

== Geography ==
A farming village situated some 11 miles (18 km) northeast of Rouen at the junction of the D 12, D 90 and the D 15 roads. Morgny station has rail connections to Rouen, Lille and Amiens.

== Heraldry ==
Arms of Morgny-la-Pommeraye	The arms of Morgny-la-Pommeraye are blazoned : Azure, a double-headed eagle (??with wings lowered??), and on a chief Or, in pale a mullet of 5 and a crescent gules, between a swan passant and a broom plant vert.

== Population ==
Historical population
Year	Pop.	±% p.a.
1968	309	—
1975	474	+6.30%
1982	590	+3.18%
1990	793	+3.77%
1999	892	+1.32%
2007	1,023	+1.73%
2012	1,003	−0.39%
2017	1,023	+0.40%
2023	1,065	+0.67%
Source: INSEE

== Places of interest ==
- The church of Notre-Dame, dating from the seventeenth century.
- The church of St.Madeleine, dating from the seventeenth century.
- The Château de Mondétour.
- A sixteenth century manorhouse.

== See also ==
- Communes of the Seine-Maritime department
