= Azincourt (novel) =

2008 novel by Bernard Cornwell

- First edition
- Author: Bernard Cornwell
- Language: English
- Genre: Historical fiction
- Publisher: HarperCollins
- Publication date: 1 October 2008
- Publication place: United Kingdom
- Media type: Print (hardback & paperback)
- Pages: 366 pp (first edition, hardback)
- ISBN: 978-0-00-727121-4 (first edition, hardback)
- OCLC: 233262808
- Dewey Decimal: 823/.914 22
- LC Class: PR6053.O75 A97 2008

Azincourt is a historical novel written by Bernard Cornwell, published in 2008. The book relates the events leading to the Battle of Agincourt through its protagonist Nicholas Hook. In the United States, it was published under the title Agincourt.

== Plot ==
Nicholas Hook, a forester and archer, feuds with Tom and Robert Perrill and their biological father, the priest Father Martin. He is compelled to participate in the hanging and burning of a community of Lollard heretics. One of them, an archer himself, asks Hook to protect his granddaughter, Sarah, after his execution. However, Father Martin decides to take the girl for himself, and in an unsuccessful attempt to shield her, Hook attacks the priest. Hook is then held for trial and anticipates execution. Father Martin and Tom Perrill rape and murder the girl, and Hook's guilt at failing to save her haunts him throughout the story.

Hook escapes and joins an expedition to Soissons, in Burgundy, as a mercenary archer. Burgundy and France are in bitter conflict. When the French attack, they win easily, sack the town, and torture and kill the English archers as well as the loyal French citizens, which shocks the rest of Europe. Hook manages to conceal himself in a house and save a local nun, Melisande, from rape. Hook believes he is guided in their escape by the voices of saints Crispin and Crispinian, the patron saints of Soissons. Melisande becomes Hook's companion and lover. Later, he discovers she is the bastard child of the powerful French Lord Ghillebert, seigneur de Lanferelle (called the "Lord of Hell").

By returning alive from Soissons and reporting the treachery of the English knight Sir Roger Pallaire, who conspired with the French and sacrificed his own archers, Hook earns good stead with his new lord, Sir John Cornewaille, and with King Henry V of England. Hook returns to France serving under Cornewaille with the royal army to win Henry the crown of France. The campaign starts horrendously with the siege of the port of Harfleur. The town's capture takes too many weeks, and disease decimates Henry's army. During a failed attack, Hook kills Robert Perrill by thrusting a crossbow bolt through the man's eye.

During the siege, Hook meets the seigneur de Lanferelle, who disapproves of Hook's relationship with his daughter Melisande and, claiming that he does indeed care for his illegitimate child, vows to kill Hook and return Melisande to the nunnery. Sometime later Hook and Melisande are formally married.

Henry, against the advice of his vassal lords, then decides to march his ragged army to Calais along the coast of France as a demonstration of his sovereignty (and as an insult to the French king). The Hook–Perrill feud reignites during the march as Tom Perrill frames Hook's brother Michael for stealing a religious pyx. Henry hangs Michael in public for the crime.

To reach Calais, the English army must cross the River Somme, but the far larger French army blocks the fords. The two opposing armies meet at Azincourt, on the day of saints Crispin and Crispinian. Torrential rain soaks the newly ploughed land, turning it into a treacherous morass, especially for the French knights in full plate armour. Natural obstacles on both sides of the battlefield narrow down towards the English. As at Crécy, the battlefield slopes downward to the English position. Before the battle, Henry, under the guise of "John Swan", speaks with his men. Hook realises that it is indeed the king after noticing his distinctive scar and tells "John Swan" that the king claims to be a religious man but is a sinner for killing an innocent man, Michael. "John Swan" seems deeply affected by this and tells Hook the king will pray for Michael everyday, which comforts Hook.

The English are ordered by Henry to hammer sharpened stakes into the ground, forming an impenetrable wall to repel the French cavalry. Hook and Tom Perrill agree to end their feud until the battle is over, believing they will both be killed by the French anyway. The English archers launch volleys when the French advance into the range of their longbows. The first attack is driven back by the English as they retreat behind the stakes, so that the French horses either bolt in terror or are impaled upon the deadly spikes.

During the mayhem, Father Martin attempts to rape Melisande. Melisande kills Martin using her crossbow. The battle is also portrayed from the opposite side via the seigneur de Lanferelle, who hopes to capture valuable prisoners, including his rival and Hook's lord, Cornewaille. The English repel the second attack through a combination of their remaining arrows and the surprising skill of the archers in hand-to-hand combat. The French decline to launch a third attack and retire, leaving thousands of French dead and many French lords captured. Hook takes Lanferelle prisoner; Lanferelle kills Tom Perrill, as Hook had vowed to his friend and mentor, Father Christopher, that he would not kill Perrill. The English claim a famous victory, and Hook returns to England with Melisande and his prisoner, the seigneur de Lanferelle, who now accepts and approves of Hook.

Hook becomes a wealthy man from the ransom of his prisoner and is promoted to command Cornewaille's archers. He pays a priest to say prayers for the girl he could not save.

== Publication ==
- The book was released on 1 October 2008 in the United Kingdom.
- The worldwide publication was in January 2009.

== Reception ==
The book's publisher and retailer reported that it exceeded sales expectations and reached a broader readership than his previous bestsellers.

Kirkus Reviews wrote: "The usual splendid stuff from the master of historical battle. There’s a bit of deus ex machina, but it’s tolerable."

== Film adaptation ==
In 2009, screenwriter Michael Hirst was said to be writing a screenplay based on the novel, with filming scheduled to begin in 2010. As of 2010, it was revealed that Michael Mann will direct the film adaptation, with filming for Mann's passion project pushed back due to script revisions by Benjamin Ross and Stuart Hazeldine.
