= Saint-Saëns, Seine-Maritime =

Saint-Saëns
- Commune
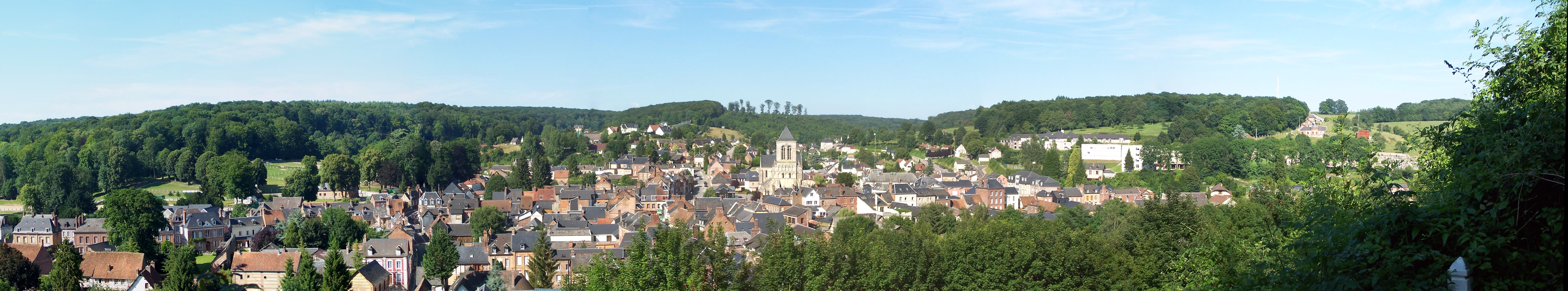
- A general view of Saint-Saëns

- Coat of arms
- Location of Saint-Saëns
- Location within France Location within Normandy
- Coordinates: 49°40′N 1°17′E
- Country: France
- Region: Normandy
- Department: Seine-Maritime
- Arrondissement: Dieppe
- Canton: Neufchâtel-en-Bray
- Intercommunality: CC Bray-Eawy

Government
  - Mayor (2020–2026): Karine Hunkeler
- Area^{1}: 25.5 km^{2} (9.8 sq mi)
- Elevation: 110 m (360 ft)
- Highest elevation: 229 m (751 ft)
- Lowest elevation: 90 m (300 ft)
- Population (2023): 2,298
  - Density: 90.1/km^{2} (233/sq mi)
- Time zone: UTC+01:00 (CET)
  - Summer (DST): UTC+02:00 (CEST)
- INSEE/Postal code: 76648 /76680
- ^{1} French Land Register data, which excludes lakes, ponds, glaciers > 1 km^{2} (0.386 sq mi or 247 acres) and river estuaries.

Saint-Saëns (French: [sɛ̃ sɑ̃s], until about 1940–1950 [sɛ̃ sɑ̃]) is a commune in the Seine-Maritime department in the Normandy region in northern France. A small town of farming and associated light industry situated by the banks of the river Varenne in the Pays de Bray, some 19 miles (31 km) southeast of Dieppe at the junction of the D929, D12, D99 and the D154 roads. Junction 11 of the A28 autoroute with the A29 autoroute is within the commune's territory.

== History ==
The year 674 saw the foundation of a monastery on the hill at the present-day location of the village. The first abbot was Sidonius (Saëns), an Irish monk and a disciple of St Philibert of Jumièges. Sidonius died in about 689 and was buried in the monastery.

Called "Sancti Sidonii" in a document of around 830, it was destroyed by the Vikings in the 9th century. In the 11th century, the seigneurs of Saint-Saëns were rich and powerful men. One of them became governor of Rouen and another excelled at the Battle of Hastings. In 1127, Helias of Saint-Saens was outlawed in England on the orders of Henry I of England for sheltering Guillaume Cliton, rebel claimant to the duchy of Normandy. The seigneurs built again on Cateliers hill, this time a castle and a collegiate church which later became the Benedictine abbey of Saint-Wandrille.

The castle was taken in 1204 by the French king Philip II Augustus and became part of France, like most of Normandy by this time.

About 1167 a Cistercian convent dedicated to Mary Magdalene was founded near the village by nuns from Bival under the patronage of Empress Matilda. This was later upgraded to an abbey in 1629. The abbess was a friend of the king's mistress, Madame de Maintenon, who often contributed to the beautification of the church. By 1740, there was only one monk left at the monastery and after the Revolution it became the present-day church.

The castle and village were looted and burned by the English and the Burgundians in 1450 and again by Henry IV of France in 1592. That same year, the Spanish ravaged the manor of Quesnay.

In the 14th century, the town was famous for its drapers, blacksmiths, potters and cutlery. Glassmaking started here in 1450 at the hamlet of Bully and was active until 1807. The tanneries were well-known up until the 19th century.

The Montérolier-Buchy–Saint-Saëns railway, connecting the town with Gare de Montérolier-Buchy, was opened in 1900 and closed in 1953.

=== Heraldry ===
Arms of Saint-Saëns	The arms of Saint-Saëns are blazoned : Argent, six torteaux gules 3, 2, 1

== Population ==
Historical population
Year	Pop.	±% p.a.
1968	2,463	—
1975	2,426	−0.22%
1982	2,339	−0.52%
1990	2,138	−1.12%
1999	2,553	+1.99%
2007	2,524	−0.14%
2012	2,534	+0.08%
2017	2,391	−1.16%
2023	2,298	−0.66%
Source: INSEE

== Main sights ==
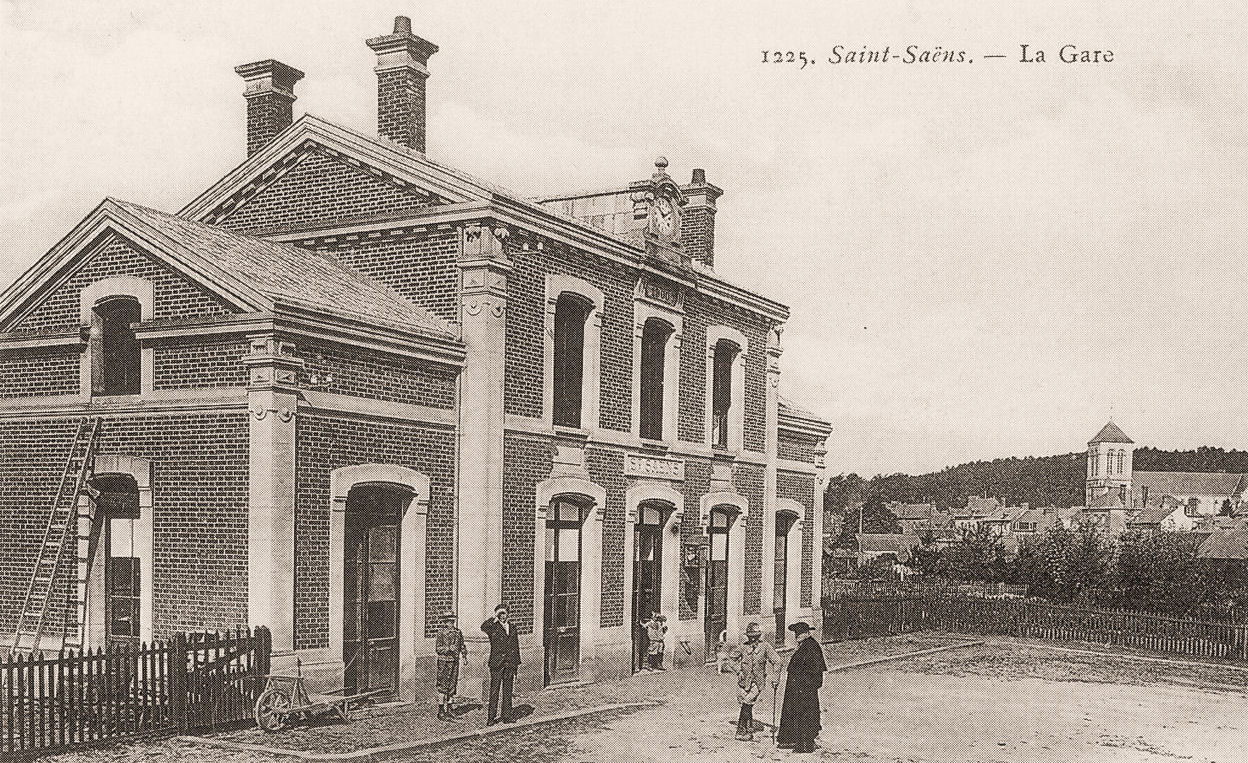
The old railway station

- The church of St Saëns, dating from the thirteenth century.
- Ruins of the twelfth century castle.
- The manor house at the hamlet of Quesnay.
- Two chateaus, at Bailly and Vaudichon.
- The seventeenth century market building.
- Vestiges of the seventeenth century Bernardines convent.

== People ==
- Sidonius of Saint-Saëns, founder of the town.

== See also ==
- Communes of the Seine-Maritime department
