= Montérolier =

- Commune
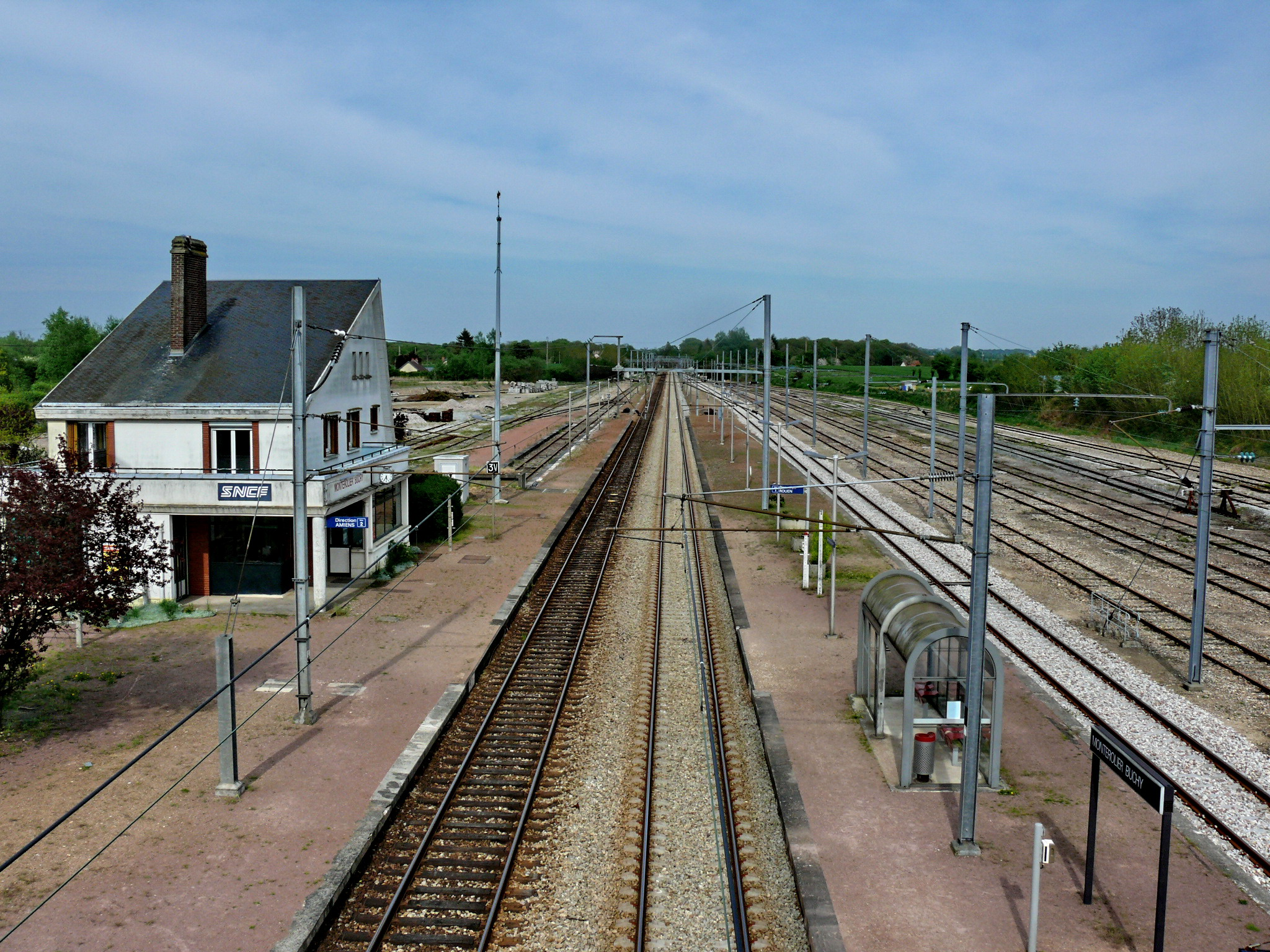
- Montérolier-Buchy railway station

- Coat of arms
- Location of Montérolier
- Location within France Location within Normandy
- Coordinates: 49°37′48″N 1°20′49″E
- Country: France
- Region: Normandy
- Department: Seine-Maritime
- Arrondissement: Dieppe
- Canton: Neufchâtel-en-Bray
- Intercommunality: CC Bray-Eawy

Government
  - Mayor (2026–32): Hervé Hunkeler
- Area^{1}: 11.7 km^{2} (4.5 sq mi)
- Elevation: 146 m (479 ft)
- Highest elevation: 212 m (696 ft)
- Lowest elevation: 132 m (433 ft)
- Population (2023): 591
  - Density: 50.5/km^{2} (131/sq mi)
- Time zone: UTC+01:00 (CET)
  - Summer (DST): UTC+02:00 (CEST)
- INSEE/Postal code: 76445 /76680
- ^{1} French Land Register data, which excludes lakes, ponds, glaciers > 1 km^{2} (0.386 sq mi or 247 acres) and river estuaries.

Montérolier (French pronunciation: [mɔ̃teʁɔlje]) is a commune in the Seine-Maritime department in the Normandy region in northern France.

== Geography ==
A farming village situated in the Pays de Bray, some 30 miles (48 km) southeast of Dieppe at the junction of the D24 and the D38 roads. The river Varenne has its source here. Montérolier-Buchy station has rail connections to Rouen, Lille and Amiens.

Surrounded by the communes Neufbosc, Mathonville and Saint-Martin-Osmonville, Montérolier is located 26 km northeast of Mont-Saint-Aignan, the largest city nearby.

== History ==
During 1943, in the Clairefeuille woods at Montérolier, the Germans built underground galleries in which to store V-1 flying bombs. After the Second World War, the galleries were opened to the public. On the 21 and 22 June 1995, 13 people died accidentally in the tunnels.

== Population ==
Historical population
Year	Pop.	±% p.a.
1968	419	—
1975	367	−1.88%
1982	398	+1.17%
1990	417	+0.58%
1999	500	+2.04%
2007	517	+0.42%
2012	563	+1.72%
2017	596	+1.15%
2023	591	−0.14%
Source: INSEE

== Places of interest ==
- The church of Notre-Dame, dating from the eighteenth century.
- Traces of an 11th-century castle.
- A nineteenth-century château.
- A sandstone cross, from the sixteenth century.
- The tunnels of Montérolier. (Closed since the accident in 1995).

== People ==
- Jean de Grouchy, sieur of Montérolier (1354–1435).

== See also ==
- Communes of the Seine-Maritime department
