= Obusier de 15 cm TR Schneider-Canet-du-Bocage =

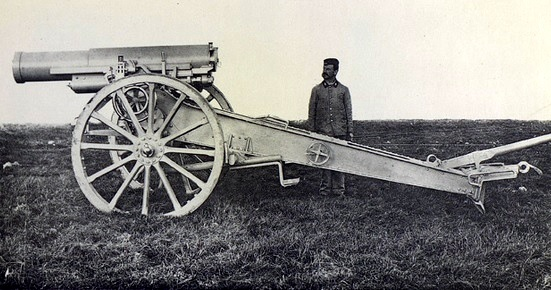
- Type: Howitzer
- Place of origin: France

Service history
- Used by: Portugal

Production history
- Designer: Concept: Colonel Carlos Roma du Bocage; Howitzer: Gustave Canet; Tractor: Eugène Brillié
- Designed: 1903
- Manufacturer: Schneider-Creusot
- No. built: 4

Specifications
- Mass: Entire battery: 26 t (26 long tons; 29 short tons); Howitzer: 3,335 kg (7,352 lb); Howitzer+Caisson: 8,200 kg (18,100 lb)
- Length: 3.8 m (12 ft 6 in)
- Barrel length: 2.1 m (6 ft 11 in) L/14
- Height: 1.6 m (5 ft 3 in)
- Shell: Separate loading cased charge and projectile
- Shell weight: 40 kg (88 lb)
- Caliber: 15 cm (5.9 in)
- Breech: Interrupted screw
- Recoil: Hydro-pneumatic
- Carriage: Box trail
- Elevation: -5° to +45°
- Traverse: 2°
- Muzzle velocity: 360 m/s (1,200 ft/s)
- Maximum firing range: 8.2 km (5.1 mi)

The Obusier de 15 cm Tir Rapide Schneider-Canet-du-Bocage was a self-contained motorized howitzer system built by the French arms company Schneider-Creusot before the First World War for Portugal. The Schneider-Canet-du-Bocage howitzers are believed to be the first purpose-built motorized artillery system in the world.

== Background ==
Although the majority of combatants had heavy field artillery before the outbreak of the First World War, none had adequate numbers of heavy guns in service, nor had they foreseen the growing importance of heavy artillery once the Western Front stagnated and trench warfare set in. Since aircraft of the period were not yet capable of carrying large-diameter bombs the burden of delivering heavy firepower fell on the artillery.

Large-caliber field guns often required extensive site preparation because the guns had to be broken down into multiple loads light enough to be towed by a horse team (max 8, ideally even 6) or the few traction engines of the time and then reassembled before use. Building a new gun could address the problem of disassembling, transporting, and reassembling a large gun, but it didn't necessarily address how to convert existing heavy weapons to make them more mobile. While rail transport proved to be the most efficient solution to moving large guns and their supplies road transport would be more flexible and able to operate in areas without fixed defenses or unsuitable for rail lines. Motorized road transport was a practical solution because the problems of heavy weight, lack of mobility, and reduced setup time were addressed.

== History ==
In 1897 to increase their market share the Establishments Schneider du Creusot acquired the Ateliers d'Artillerie du Havre from shipbuilding company Forges et Chantiers de la Méditerranée. As part of that purchase the engineer, Gustave Canet was added to Schneider et Compagnie's design team. Canet had by that time already designed many artillery systems and the guns from his Le Havre workshops were referred to as 'Schneider-Canet' guns for years after.

The concept for the Obusier de 15 cm TR Schneider-Canet-du-Bocage came from a Portuguese engineer Colonel Carlos Roma du Bocage who published a groundbreaking report called the Baterias moveis. Sua influencia na fortificaçao (The influence of mobile batteries on fortifications). In his report, du Bocage advocated a mobile defense strategy for Lisbon based on quick reaction forces with mobile self-contained howitzer batteries. At roughly the same time French Lieutenant Colonel Christophe Peigné began working on a proposal to mount artillery on rail carriages for use at the forts of Verdun, Toul, Épinal, and Belfort. Both Peigné and du Bocage were assisted by the Schneider engineer Gustave Canet. Unlike the du Bocage system the Peigné-Canet-Schneider mle 1897 gun carriage ran on narrow gauge rails installed at French forts.

By motorizing his howitzer batteries du Bocage was trying to solve several technical problems such as 1) Fixed fortifications are expensive to build, man, and maintain. An enemy isn't obligated to attack your fortifications and fortifications can't be built to protect everything. 2) If the guns of your forts face the wrong direction an enemy could attack from an unexpected direction where defenses were weaker. 3) Lacking mobility more guns would be needed to defend likely avenues of attack which would be wasteful because some guns would be engaged while others wouldn't. 4) Setup time for the guns would be reduced because the entire battery and their supplies would be transported assembled. 5) If the forts were overrun there wasn't a good way to evacuate the guns and they would be lost to the enemy. 6) Although rail transport was the most efficient form of transport available for both the guns and their supplies rail lines couldn't be laid everywhere to defend from an attack. Road transport could utilize existing road infrastructure and go where no fortifications or rail lines existed.

By choosing an internal combustion engine instead of a steam-powered artillery tractor du Bocage was attempting to solve several technical problems such as 1) Since steam engines create a lot of heat and sometimes give off sparks from their stacks it was reasoned a gasoline engine would be safer for transporting ammunition. 2) It was reasoned that a gas engine started faster and didn't need to wait to raise steam. 3) Since there weren't rail lines everywhere it was reasoned that there wouldn't be a source of coal nearby or the water needed for a steam engine. 4) Since steam engines create a plume of smoke and steam during the day it was reasoned a gasoline engine would be less visible. It was also reasoned that a gas engine could operate at night without giving off a visible glow or sparks at night. 5) It was reasoned that a gas engine was easier to operate than a steam engine and gun crew members could double as drivers.

== Design ==
The Obusier de 15 cm TR Schneider-Canet-du-Bocage was a breech-loaded built-up gun made of steel with an interrupted screw breech, box trail carriage, no gun shield, two wooden-spoked steel-rimmed wheels, and hydro-pneumatic recoil mechanism that fired separate loading cased charges and ammunition. The howitzers were capable of -5° to +45° of elevation as well as 2° of traverse. Traverse was controlled by shifting the gun from side to side on the axle of the carriage. The howitzers were conventional for their time and similar horse-drawn Schneider-Canet 15 cm (5.9 in) L/12 howitzers were already in service with Bulgaria.

The carriages of the howitzers were modified for motor traction by mounting a hitch on each gun so they could be joined together nose to tail for transport. Each battery numbered four guns and their artillery tractor. Each gun had a caisson but instead of hooking the caissons to the guns as they would be for horse traction they were joined together from nose to tail and towed by their tractor. A drawback of the du Bocage system was its convoy weighed 26 tons which meant it was restricted to good quality roads, in good weather, with bridges capable of supporting its weight. The 4-ton 12 hp tractors could tow the convoy at 5–6 km/h (3.1–3.7 mph) over good roads in good weather dropping to 2–3 km/h (1.2–1.9 mph) in bad weather. If the convoy needed to cross gradients steeper than +12° or there was soft ground the tractor could unhook from its carriages and it could move forward alone. The tractor could then be anchored and use a powerful winch to drag its carriages forward.

After examining the preliminary drafts, the Portuguese Minister of War with the agreement of the Fortifications Commission decided to build a battery of 4 howitzers. The battery was ordered in January 1903 from Schneider and was completed in November of the same year. The flatbed tractors were designed by the French engineer Eugène Brillié who later designed the Schneider CA1 tank. The tractors were built by Société nancéienne d'automobiles and were based on a dump truck design used for mining and the tractor could carry 60 complete rounds (shell+propellant) on its flatbed. During testing, the tractors were shown to be capable of traveling 300 km (190 mi) with their carriages and 400 km (250 mi) without. The fuel consumption did not exceed 1/2 liter of gasoline or alcohol per horsepower-hour.

== Portuguese service ==
There may have only been one Schneider-Canet-du-Bocage howitzer battery in Portuguese service and it's unlikely that battery was used during World War I. An example of the howitzer can be found at the Museu Militar in Lisbon.

== Photo Gallery ==
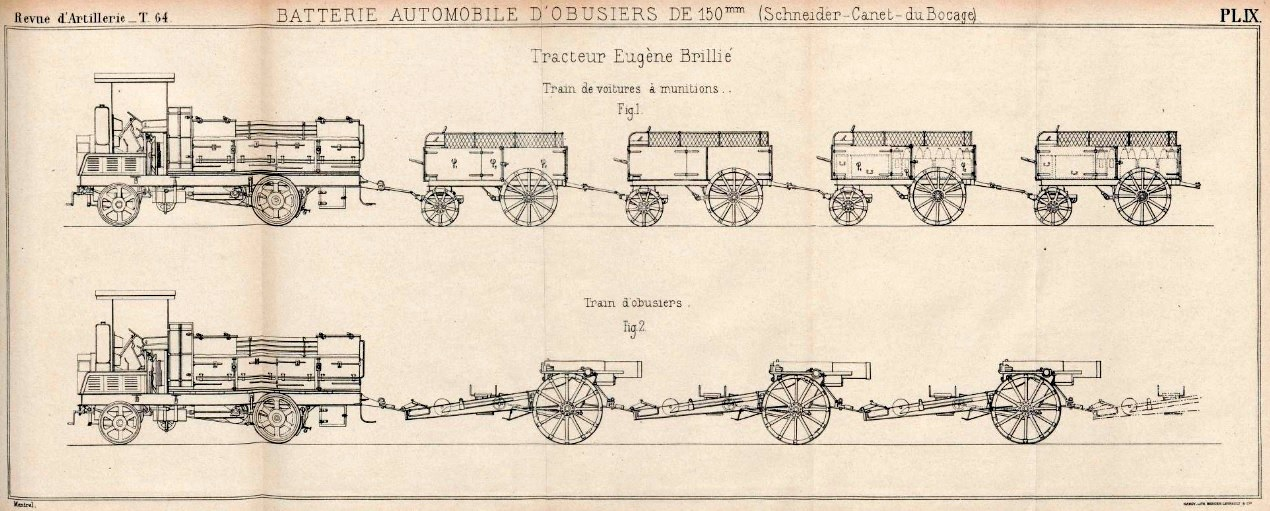
The du Bocage logistics train.

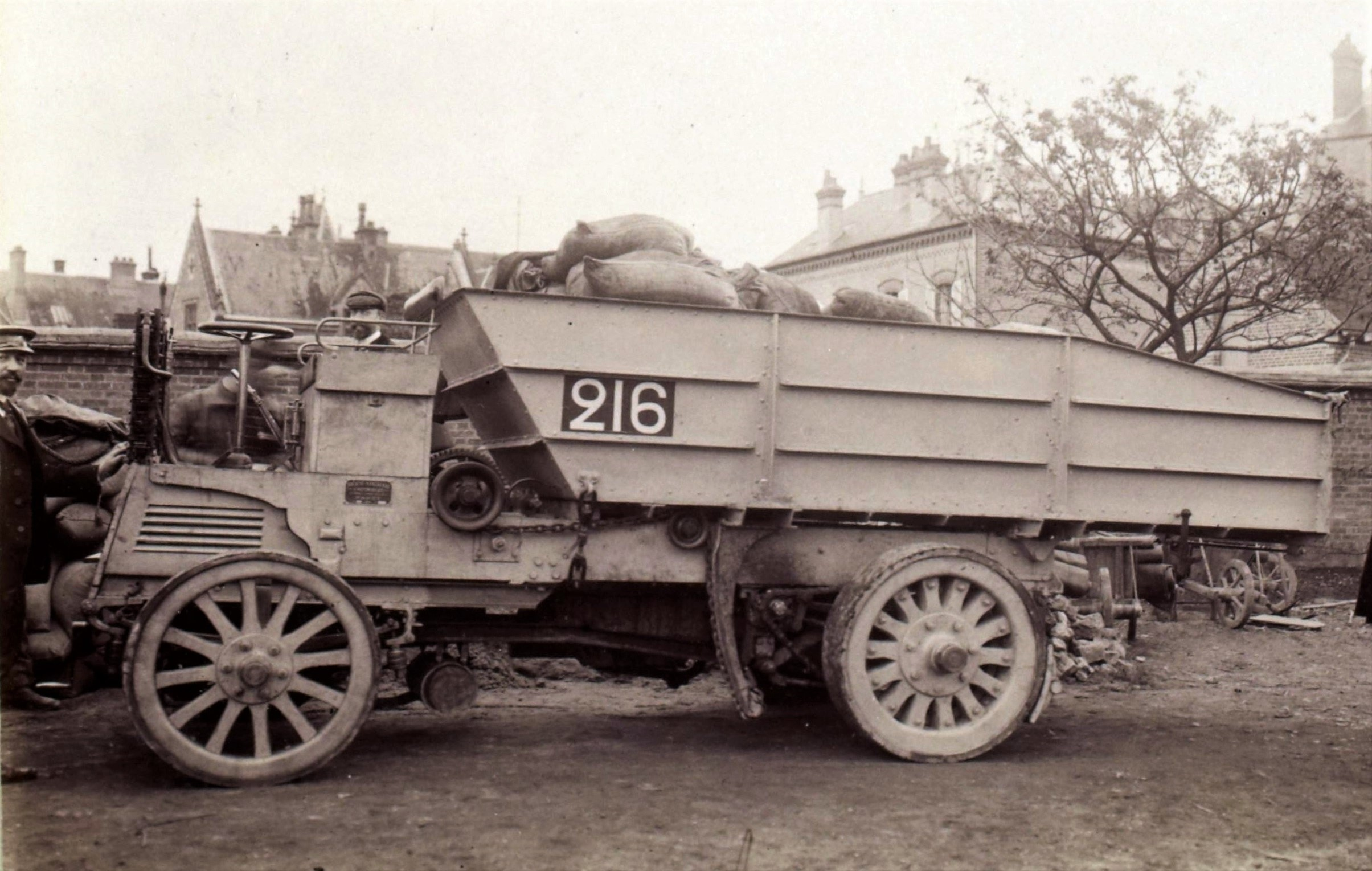
The dump truck that the artillery tractor was based on.

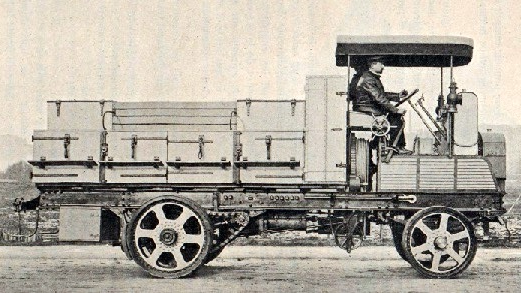
The artillery tractor carrying ammunition for the gun crew.

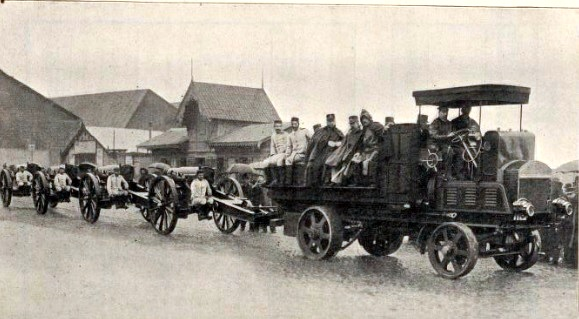
A battery of howitzers on the move. Note the gun crew members riding on the artillery tractor and seats on the gun carriage.

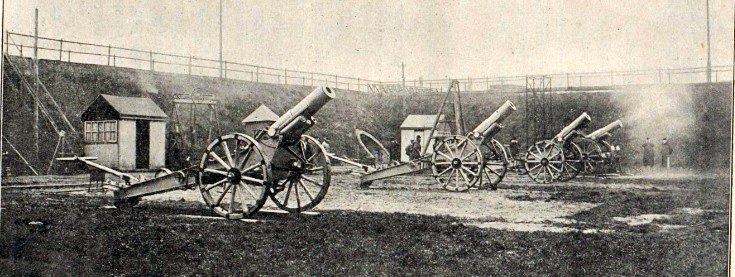
A battery of howitzers on a firing range.

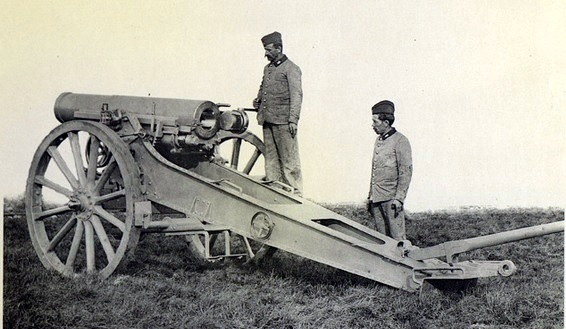
A rear view of the howitzer showing its box trail carriage and interrupted screw breech.
