= Jean de Grouchy =

French knight

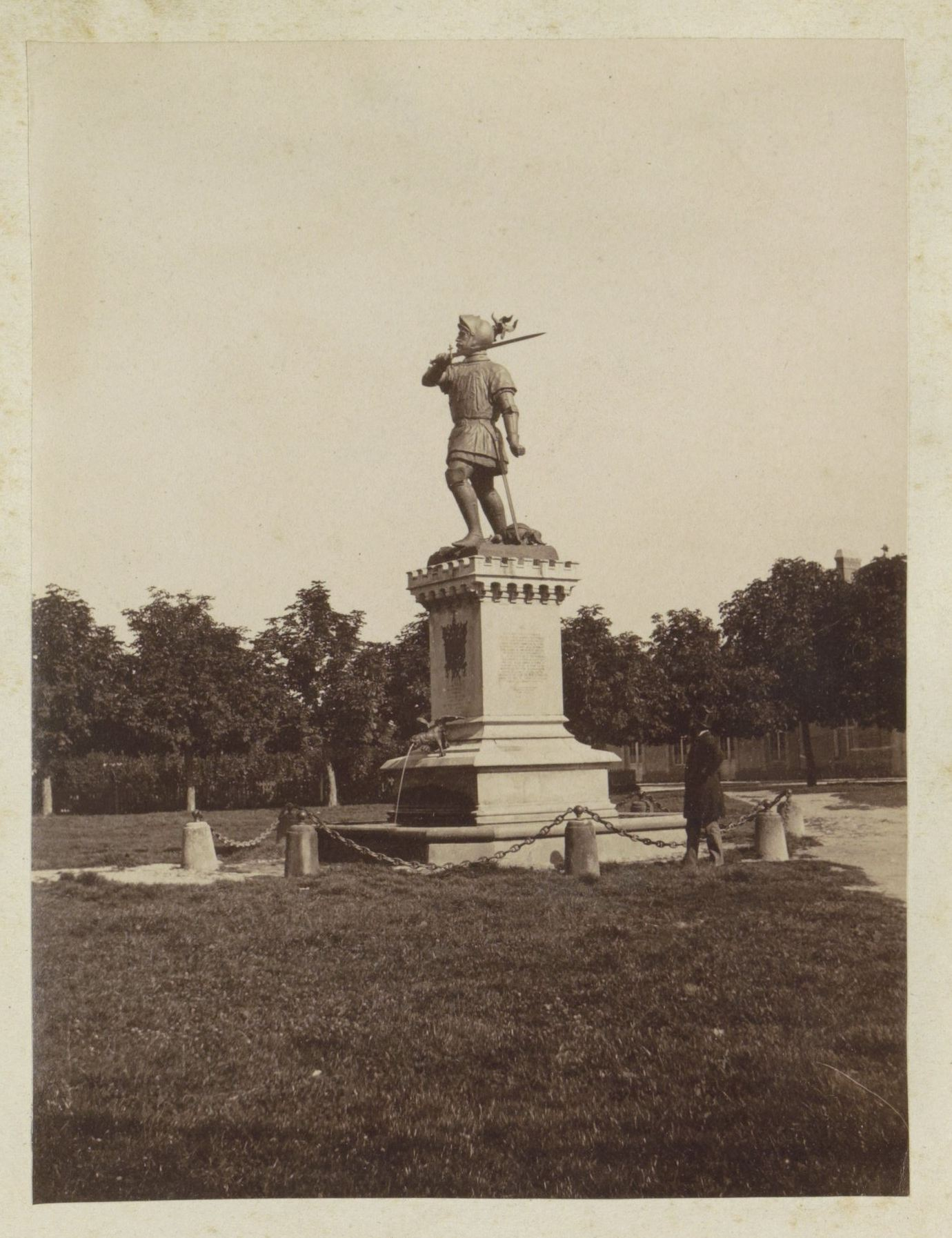
Statue of Jean de Grouchy in Harfleur, RP-F-2007-66-13-1

Jean de Grouchy (1354 – 4 November 1435) was a Norman knight, the Sieur de Montérolier from 1395. Known as "the bravest of the brave" and "Father of the Cauchois" (the people of the region of the Pays de Caux), he is remembered for fighting against the English in Normandy during the Hundred Years War.

Jean may have fought at the Battle of Agincourt, and supported the Dauphin, later King Charles VII of France. As a result of their participation in the war against England, Jean and his brother Louis had their lands confiscated by King Henry V of England in 1419 and given to an Englishman.

== Liberation of Harfleur ==
Harfleur had been occupied by the English since 1415, but by 1435 it was the last place they still held in Normandy. Having learned that a number of Harfleur residents were ready to support any attempt against the enemy, de Grouchy, along with the Cauchois leaders, Floquet, Carnier and Lahire, developed a plan together with 104 of the inhabitants of Harfleur. On the night of 3/4 November 1435, while John de Rieux diverted the enemy’s attention with 4,000 mounted troops, he approached the town with the Cauchois troops under his banner to enter at the appropriate time and take the city. A fire lit in the suburbs near the Porte d'Eure by the 104 faithful French residents would be the signal to attack.

At daybreak, the English sentries, seeing the high walls of the suburb in flames, gave warning and garrison troops rushed out to extinguish the fire. This was the moment de Grouchy and his men had waited for. They raced up the slope to the breach in the walls where the English had penetrated in 1415 and seized the town, ruthlessly killing their English enemies and anyone else who opposed them. Unfortunately, climbing up a slope at the age of 81 years, Grouchy was one of the 40 attackers that were killed in action. Ten years later, the English returned in Normandy and confiscated the property of the de Grouchy family.

== Legacy ==
In 1875 a bronze statue of de Grouchy was erected at Harfleur. He is depicted in armour, with sword in hand.
