= Mathonville =

- Commune
- Coat of arms
- Location of Mathonville
- Location within France Location within Normandy
- Coordinates: 49°37′20″N 1°22′59″E
- Country: France
- Region: Normandy
- Department: Seine-Maritime
- Arrondissement: Dieppe
- Canton: Neufchâtel-en-Bray
- Intercommunality: CC Bray-Eawy

Government
  - Mayor (2026–32): Julien Ravera
- Area^{1}: 4.09 km^{2} (1.58 sq mi)
- Elevation: 220 m (720 ft)
- Highest elevation: 229 m (751 ft)
- Lowest elevation: 170 m (560 ft)
- Population (2023): 344
  - Density: 84.1/km^{2} (218/sq mi)
- Time zone: UTC+01:00 (CET)
  - Summer (DST): UTC+02:00 (CEST)
- INSEE/Postal code: 76416 /76680
- ^{1} French Land Register data, which excludes lakes, ponds, glaciers > 1 km^{2} (0.386 sq mi or 247 acres) and river estuaries.

Mathonville (French pronunciation: [matɔ̃vil]) is a commune in the Seine-Maritime department in the Normandy region in northern France.

Its inhabitants are called Mathonville and Mathonvillaises.

== Geography ==
A small farming village situated in the Pays de Bray, some 35 miles (56 km) southeast of Dieppe at the junction of the D118 and the D38 roads.

Surrounded by the municipalities of Bosc-Bordel, Montérolier and Buchy, Mathonville is located 28 km northeast of Mont-Saint-Aignan, the largest city nearby.

== Population ==
Historical population
| Year | Pop. | ±% p.a. |
|---|---|---|
| 1968 | 110 | — |
| 1975 | 139 | +3.40% |
| 1982 | 137 | −0.21% |
| 1990 | 154 | +1.47% |
| 1999 | 174 | +1.37% |
| 2007 | 228 | +3.44% |
| 2012 | 292 | +5.07% |
| 2017 | 319 | +1.78% |
| 2023 | 344 | +1.27% |
Source: INSEE

== See also ==
- Communes of the Seine-Maritime department
