= Amiens–Rouen railway =

French railway line

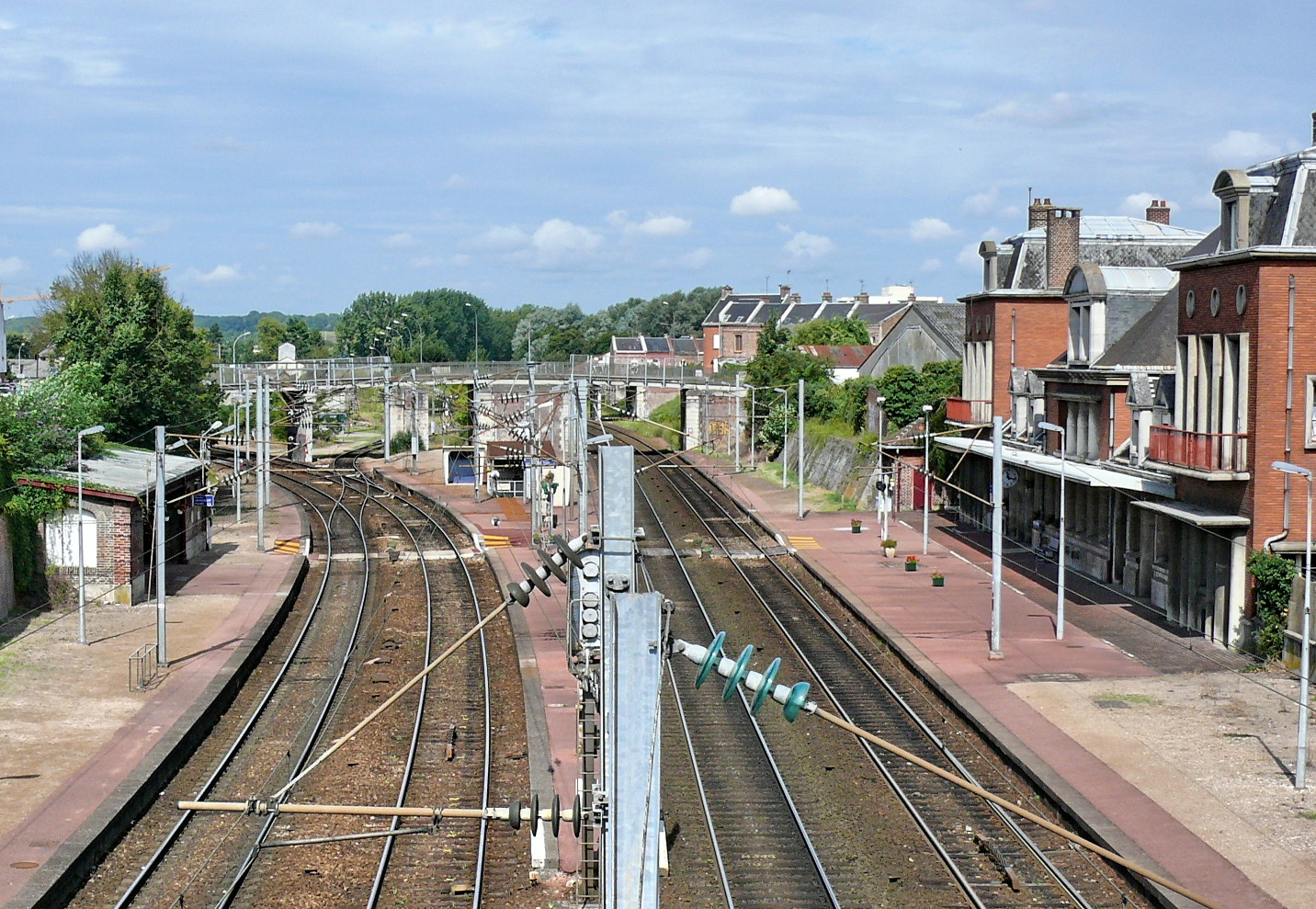

Overview
- Status: Operational
- Owner: RFF
- Locale: France (Hauts-de-France, Normandy)
- Termini: Amiens station; Rouen-Rive-Droite station

Service
- System: SNCF
- Operator(s): SNCF

History
- Opened: 1867

Technical
- Line length: 114 km (71 mi)
- Number of tracks: Double track
- Track gauge: 1,435 mm (4 ft 8 1/2 in) standard gauge
- Electrification: 25 kV 50 Hz

The railway from Amiens to Rouen is a French 114-kilometre long railway line, that connects Amiens to Rouen. It was opened in 1867. The line was electrified on 27 August 1984 at 25 kV 50 Hz, and was equipped with the restrained permissivity automatic blocking system, which since the 1990s has offered increasingly unsatisfactory operating conditions with respect to the increasing mixed passenger and goods traffic on the line.

== Route ==
The Amiens–Rouen railway begins near the Saint-Roch (Somme) station in Amiens, where it branches off the railway from Amiens to Boulogne. It runs in generally southwestern direction, passing through Poix-de-Picardie, Abancourt and Serqueux until it reaches its terminus in Rouen.

A branch line from Montérolier-Buchy station to Saint-Saëns has been closed and removed.

=== Main stations ===
The main stations on the Amiens–Rouen railway are:

- Amiens station
- Abancourt station
- Serqueux station
- Rouen-Rive-Droite station

== Use ==
One of the peculiarities of this line is the role of freight traffic, which is far more important than passenger traffic. In 1992–93, this line saw transport of 8,000 tonnes of goods daily, 60% of it in the Amiens - Rouen direction. The importance of the freight traffic is explained by the industrial importance of the two regions linked by the line and in particular by the ports of Rouen and Le Havre at the Rouen end. On the other hand, passenger demand is not strong but tends to be focussed by the express TER Rouen - Amiens - Arras - Douai - Lille axis.

The Amiens–Rouen railway is used by TER Hauts-de-France and TER Normandie regional passenger services on the whole line. The typical daily service (2019) sees five passenger trains in each direction, two of which are extended to/from Lille.
