= Canton of Londinières =

Coordinates: 49°50′13″N 1°25′00″E

Londinières
- Former canton
- Interactive map of Londinières
- Country: France
- Region: Normandy
- Department: Seine-Maritime
- No. of communes: {{{nbcomm}}}
- Disbanded: 2015
- Area: 194.62 km^{2} (75.14 sq mi)
- Population (2012): 5,251
  - Density: 26.98/km^{2} (69.88/sq mi)

The Canton of Londinières is a former canton situated in the Seine-Maritime département and in the Haute-Normandie region of northern France. It was disbanded following the French canton reorganisation which came into effect in March 2015. It consisted of 16 communes, which joined the canton of Neufchâtel-en-Bray in 2015. It had a total of 5,251 inhabitants (2012).

== Geography ==
An area of farming and forestry in the arrondissement of Dieppe, centred on the town of Londinières. The altitude varies from 40m (Osmoy-Saint-Valery) to 224m (Clais) for an average altitude of 116m.

The canton comprised 16 communes:

- Bailleul-Neuville
- Baillolet
- Bures-en-Bray
- Clais
- Croixdalle
- Fréauville
- Fresnoy-Folny
- Grandcourt
- Londinières
- Osmoy-Saint-Valery
- Preuseville
- Puisenval
- Saint-Pierre-des-Jonquières
- Sainte-Agathe-d'Aliermont
- Smermesnil
- Wanchy-Capval

== Population ==
Historical population Canton of Londinières
Year	1962	1968	1975	1982	1990	1999
Pop.	5,485	5,913	5,425	5,014	4,747	4,726
±%	—	+7.8%	−8.3%	−7.6%	−5.3%	−0.4%
From the year 1962 on: No double counting – residents of multiple communes (e.g. students and military personnel) are counted only once. Source: INSEE

== See also ==
- Arrondissements of the Seine-Maritime department
- Cantons of the Seine-Maritime department
- Communes of the Seine-Maritime department
