= Gondinet =

Gondinet is a French surname. Notable people with the surname include:

- Edmond Gondinet (1828–1888), French writer and playwright
- Michel Gondinet (1855–1936), French lawyer, writer, sports leader, and nephew of the above
- Georges Gondinet (born 1956), French editor, writer, translator, and founder of Éditions Pardès
