= Léon de Janzé =

French sports leader and politician (1848–1911)

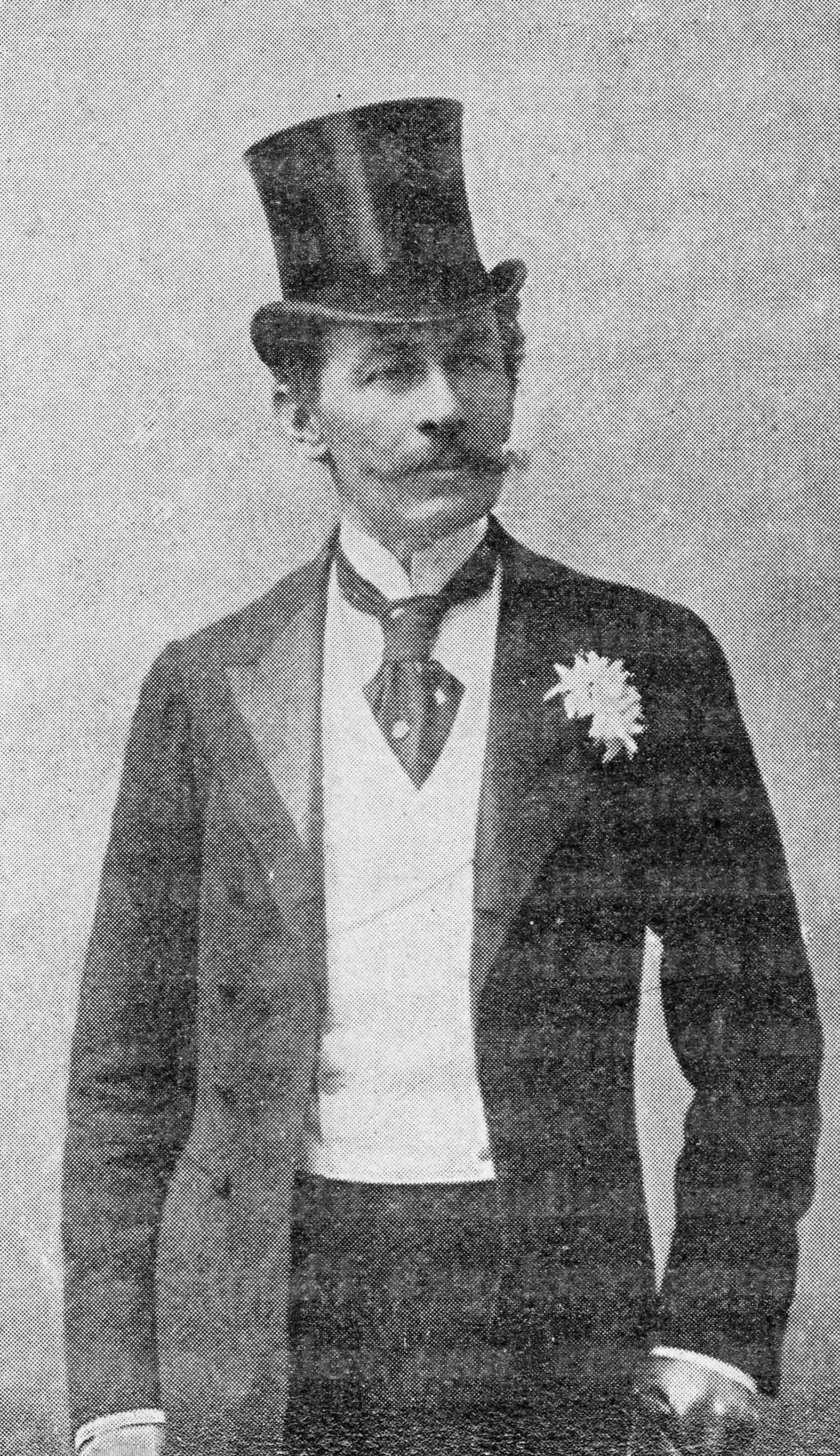
- Léon de Janzé
- Born: Léon Frédéric de Janzé; 26 February 1848; Former 1st arrondissement of Paris, France
- Died: 21 November 1911 (aged 63); Saint-Pierre-des-Jonquières, France
- Citizenship: French
- Occupations: Politician; Sports leader
- Known for: President of the USFSA

President of the Société sportive de l'Île de Puteaux
- In office 1886–1910

President of the USFSA
- In office July 1891 – 1891
- Preceded by: Georges de Saint-Clair
- Succeeded by: Michel Gondinet

President of the USFSA
- In office 1892–1893
- Preceded by: Michel Gondinet
- Succeeded by: Adolphe de Pallissaux

President of the USFSA
- In office 1894–1898
- Preceded by: Michel Gondinet
- Succeeded by: Paul Escudier

Mayor of Saint-Pierre-des-Jonquières

Léon Frédéric de Janzé (26 February 1848 – 21 November 1911) was a French sports leader and politician who served as the president of the Union des Sociétés Françaises de Sports Athlétiques from 1894 until 1898, as well as the president of the first Olympic Congress in 1894.

== Early and personal life ==
Vicomte Léon Frédéric de Janzé (Note: Some sources wrongly state that his full name is François Louis Léon de Janzé.) was born in the old 1st arrondissement of Paris on 26 February 1848, as the son of Édouard de Janzé and Eugénie Tirebarbe d'Aubermesnil. The Janzé family was ennobled during the Second Restoration in 1818.

In February 1897, Janzé married Moya Hennessy (1868–1941), daughter of the landscape painter William John Hennessy, in London, and the couple had three children Frédéric, who went on to marry Alice Silverthorne, and Henri.

== Political career ==
Owner of a castle in Parfondeval, Aisne, Janzé was elected general councilor of Seine-Maritime in 1886, a position that he held for 24 years, until he died in 1910, and at some point, he was also a mayor of Saint-Pierre-des-Jonquières.

== Sporting career ==
A sports lover, especially tennis, Janzé founded the Société sportive de l' Île de Puteaux in 1886, being then elected as its first president, and under his management, this society built the very first regular asphalt tennis courts in the Paris region, near the Pont de Neuilly, which was frequented by high society and Americans eager to play their favorite sport. (Note: Some sources wrongly claim that he founded this society in 1873.) This court was built on a piece of land that belonged to Baron Henri de Rothschild, who rented it to the Société de Puteaux until it became their property in 1895. By the end of that century, Société de Puteaux already had 13 courts and 1300 registered members, so they were chosen to organize and host the tennis events of the 1900 Olympic Games, which were contested by 73 players, including 15 women, who were the first female Olympians.

In July 1891, Janzé succeeded Georges de Saint-Clair as the new president of the USFSA, but he was then replaced just a few months later by Michel Gondinet, who himself also only lasted a year, as Janzé replaced him in 1892. In November of that year, the USFSA celebrated its 5th anniversary with a "sports festival" that included a conference in Sorbonne convened by Pierre Coubertin, who for the first time publicly proposed the revival of the Olympic Games; the USFSA president Janzé was present in this historic conference. In early 1893, he was replaced by Adolphe de Pallissaux, but he eventually returned to the presidency of the USFSA for a third time in 1894, and this time he held that position for four years, until 1898, when he was replaced by Paul Escudier. During this period, he was the president of the first Olympic Congress in 1894, which was organized by USFSA's secretary-general, Baron de Coubertin. He was also among the founding members of the French Olympic Committee in 1894, remaining as such for a full decade, until 1904.

In 1905, the French newspaper Les Sports modernes stated that "NO sporting venue is as elegant as the Puteaux tennis club", describing it as being "located in the center of a cheerful, green island, with very modern apartments for players, English-style sinks, cold and hot showers, lockers for rackets, costumes, and shoes, everything is designed for the perfect comfort of the members of the circle".

== Death ==
Janzé died in Paris on 21 November 1910, at the age of 62, and he was buried at Père Lachaise Cemetery, and exactly one year later, in the morning of 21 November 1911, his family attended a funeral ceremony at the Saint-Pierre church in Neuilly.
