= Ambroise-Marie Carré =

- Born: 25 July 1908; Fleury-les-Aubrais, France
- Died: 15 January 2004 (aged 95); Ancourt, France
- Occupation: Priest
- Known for: Member of the Académie française

Ambroise-Marie Carré OP (25 July 1908 – 15 January 2004) was a Catholic priest, author and member of the Académie française. Born in Fleury-les-Aubrais in Loiret, France, Carré studied at l'école Saint-Joseph and the collège Sainte-Croix de Neuilly before entering the Dominican order in 1926 and being ordained a priest in 1933. Not long thereafter, he was to edit, from 1936 until 1939, the Revue des Jeunes. Under the German Occupation, following the capitulation of the French government to the Nazis during the Second World War, Carré aided those persecuted by the Vichy government, regardless of their religion or ethnicity; for this, he was awarded the Légion d'honneur and the Croix de Guerre.

Both before and after the war, he preached many sermons and participated in conferences in France and abroad (especially in the Netherlands, Switzerland, Italy, and Belgium). He preached the Lenten sermons many times at Notre Dame de Paris, and in 1964, Paul VI called him to present spiritual exercises at the Vatican. He was elected to the Académie française on 26 June 1975, replacing Jean Cardinal Daniélou, a post he held until his death on 15 January 2004 at Ancourt, in France.
