= Fréauville =

- Commune
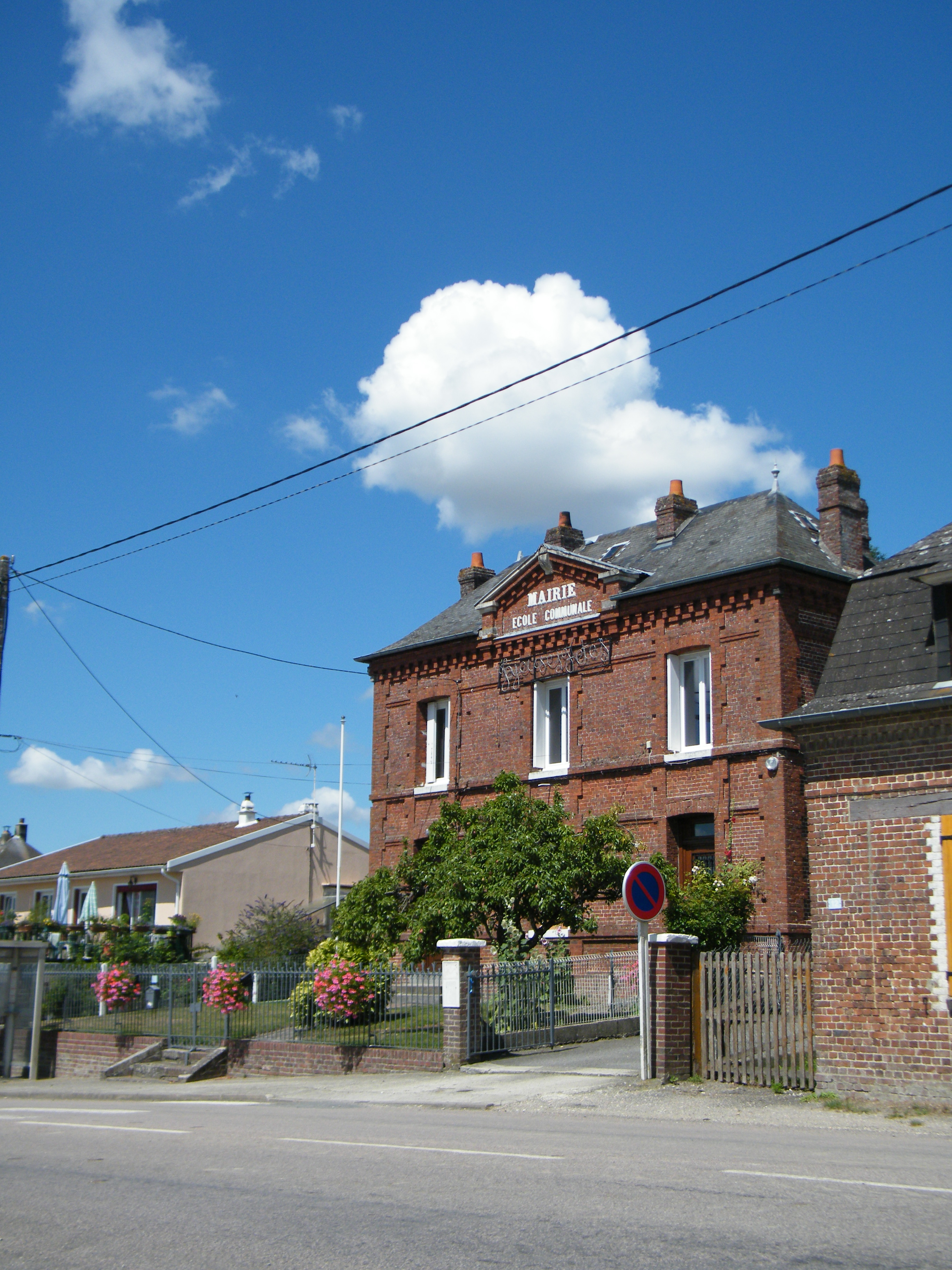
- The town hall in Fréauville
- Location of Fréauville
- Location within France Location within Normandy
- Coordinates: 49°49′34″N 1°25′02″E
- Country: France
- Region: Normandy
- Department: Seine-Maritime
- Arrondissement: Dieppe
- Canton: Neufchâtel-en-Bray
- Intercommunality: CC Londinières

Government
  - Mayor (2026–32): Christian Martel
- Area^{1}: 5.41 km^{2} (2.09 sq mi)
- Elevation: 94 m (308 ft)
- Highest elevation: 170 m (560 ft)
- Lowest elevation: 74 m (243 ft)
- Population (2023): 143
  - Density: 26.4/km^{2} (68.5/sq mi)
- Time zone: UTC+01:00 (CET)
  - Summer (DST): UTC+02:00 (CEST)
- INSEE/Postal code: 76280 /76660
- ^{1} French Land Register data, which excludes lakes, ponds, glaciers > 1 km^{2} (0.386 sq mi or 247 acres) and river estuaries.

Fréauville (French pronunciation: [fʁeovil]) is a commune in the Seine-Maritime department in the Normandy region in northern France.

== Geography ==
A small farming village situated by the banks of the river Eaulne in the Pays de Bray, some 21 miles (34 km) southeast of Dieppe, at the junction of the D117 and the D1314 roads.

== Population ==
Historical population
Year	Pop.	±% p.a.
1968	195	—
1975	155	−3.23%
1982	131	−2.37%
1990	140	+0.83%
1999	141	+0.08%
2007	136	−0.45%
2012	132	−0.60%
2017	132	+0.00%
2023	143	+1.34%
Source: INSEE

== Places of interest ==
- The twelfth century church of St.Pierre.

== See also ==
- Communes of the Seine-Maritime department
