= Bailleul-Neuville =

- Commune
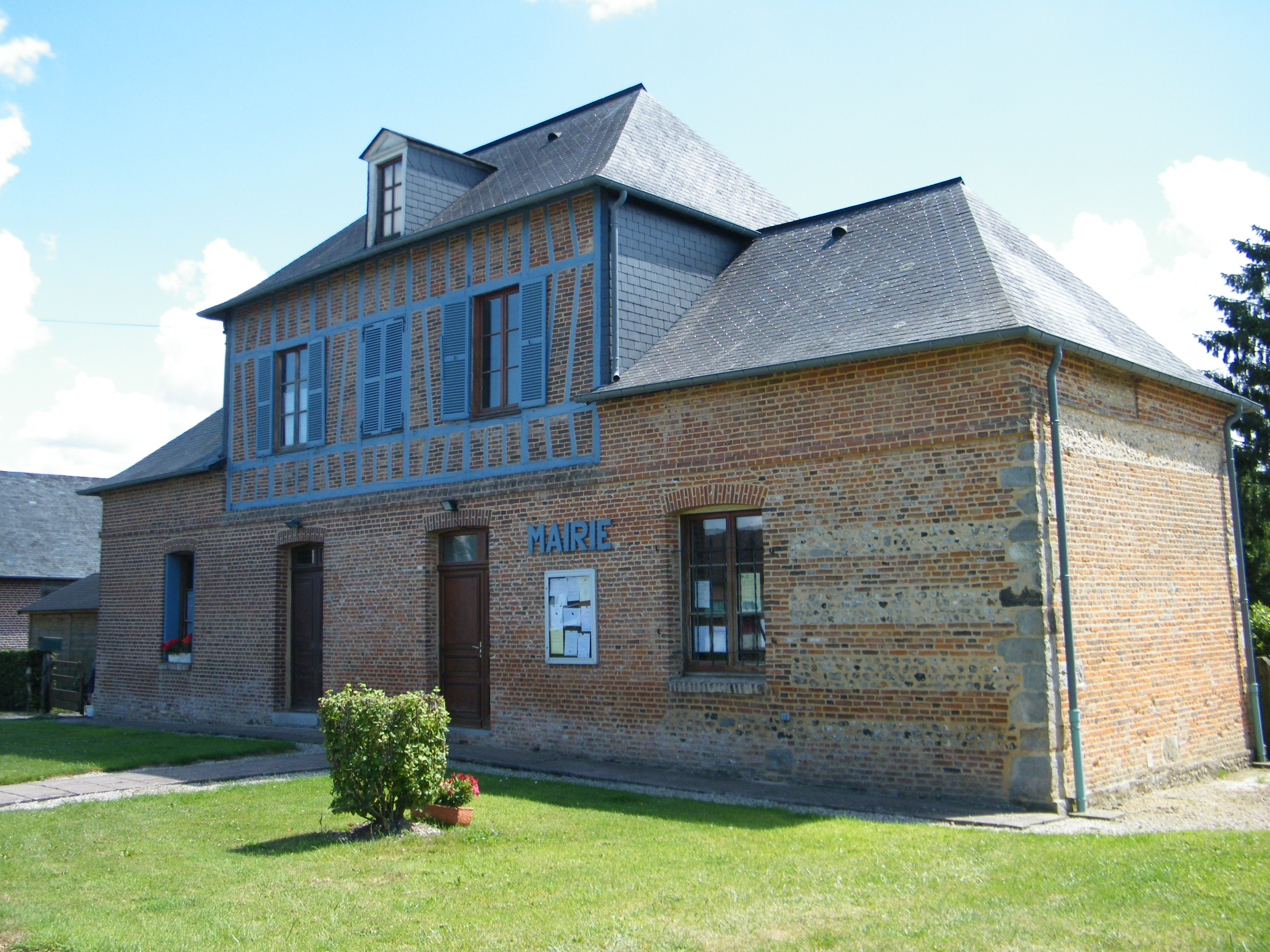
- The town hall in Bailleul-Neuville
- Location of Bailleul-Neuville
- Location within France Location within Normandy
- Coordinates: 49°48′38″N 1°25′24″E
- Country: France
- Region: Normandy
- Department: Seine-Maritime
- Arrondissement: Dieppe
- Canton: Neufchâtel-en-Bray
- Intercommunality: CC Londinières

Government
  - Mayor (2020–2026): Céline Carnet
- Area^{1}: 13.14 km^{2} (5.07 sq mi)
- Elevation: 103 m (338 ft)
- Highest elevation: 216 m (709 ft)
- Lowest elevation: 79 m (259 ft)
- Population (2023): 220
  - Density: 17/km^{2} (43/sq mi)
- Time zone: UTC+01:00 (CET)
  - Summer (DST): UTC+02:00 (CEST)
- INSEE/Postal code: 76052 /76660
- ^{1} French Land Register data, which excludes lakes, ponds, glaciers > 1 km^{2} (0.386 sq mi or 247 acres) and river estuaries.

Bailleul-Neuville (French pronunciation: [bajœl nøvil]) is a commune in the Seine-Maritime department in the Normandy region in northern France.

== Geography ==
A forestry and farming village in the valley of the Eaulne river, in the Pays de Bray, situated some 19 miles (31 km) southeast of Dieppe, on the D117 and D1314 roads.

== Population ==
Historical population
| Year | Pop. | ±% p.a. |
|---|---|---|
| 1968 | 254 | — |
| 1975 | 245 | −0.51% |
| 1982 | 195 | −3.21% |
| 1990 | 184 | −0.72% |
| 1999 | 179 | −0.31% |
| 2007 | 164 | −1.09% |
| 2012 | 176 | +1.42% |
| 2017 | 216 | +4.18% |
| 2023 | 220 | +0.31% |
Source: INSEE

== Places of interest ==
- The church of St. Waast, dating from the eleventh century.
- The church of Notre-Dame at Neuville, dating from the twelfth century.
- The château de Bailleul.

== See also ==
- Communes of the Seine-Maritime department
