= Baillolet =

- Commune
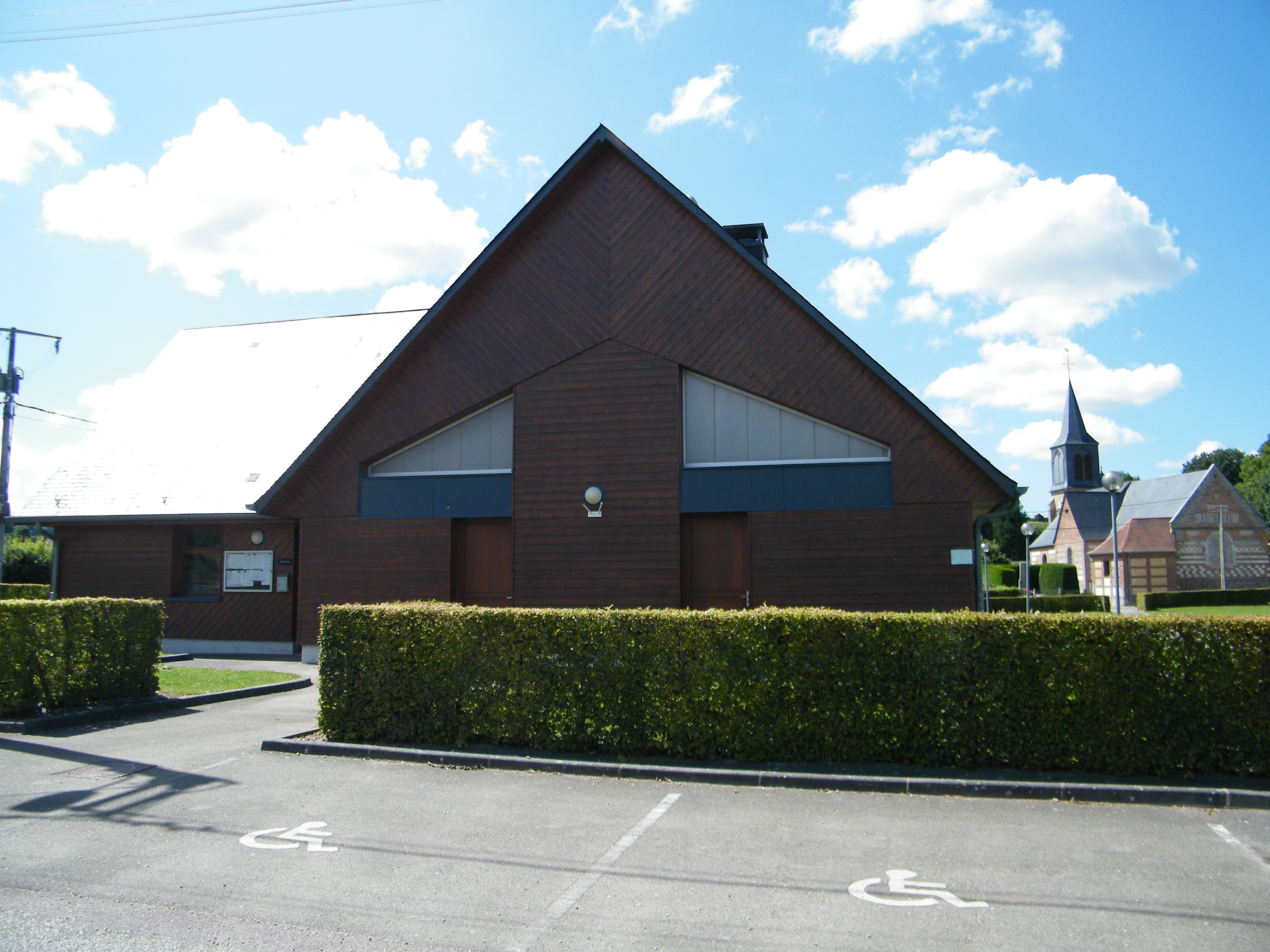
- The town hall in Baillolet
- Location of Baillolet
- Location within France Location within Normandy
- Coordinates: 49°47′38″N 1°26′19″E
- Country: France
- Region: Normandy
- Department: Seine-Maritime
- Arrondissement: Dieppe
- Canton: Neufchâtel-en-Bray
- Intercommunality: CC Londinières

Government
  - Mayor (2026–32): Maryse Lermechain
- Area^{1}: 8.74 km^{2} (3.37 sq mi)
- Elevation: 115 m (377 ft)
- Highest elevation: 221 m (725 ft)
- Lowest elevation: 86 m (282 ft)
- Population (2023): 116
  - Density: 13.3/km^{2} (34.4/sq mi)
- Time zone: UTC+01:00 (CET)
  - Summer (DST): UTC+02:00 (CEST)
- INSEE/Postal code: 76053 /76660
- ^{1} French Land Register data, which excludes lakes, ponds, glaciers > 1 km^{2} (0.386 sq mi or 247 acres) and river estuaries.

Baillolet (French pronunciation: [bajɔlɛ]) is a commune in the Seine-Maritime department in the Normandy region in northern France.

== Geography ==
A forestry and farming village in the valley of the Eaulne river, in the Pays de Bray, situated some 19 miles (31 km) southeast of Dieppe, on the D117 and D1314 roads.

== Population ==
Historical population
Year	Pop.	±% p.a.
1968	209	—
1975	177	−2.35%
1982	155	−1.88%
1990	140	−1.26%
1999	128	−0.99%
2007	133	+0.48%
2012	110	−3.73%
2017	106	−0.74%
2023	116	+1.51%
Source: INSEE

== Places of interest ==
- The church of St.Martin, dating from the nineteenth century.
- A Merovingian cemetery.

== See also ==
- Communes of the Seine-Maritime department
