= Wanchy-Capval =

- Commune
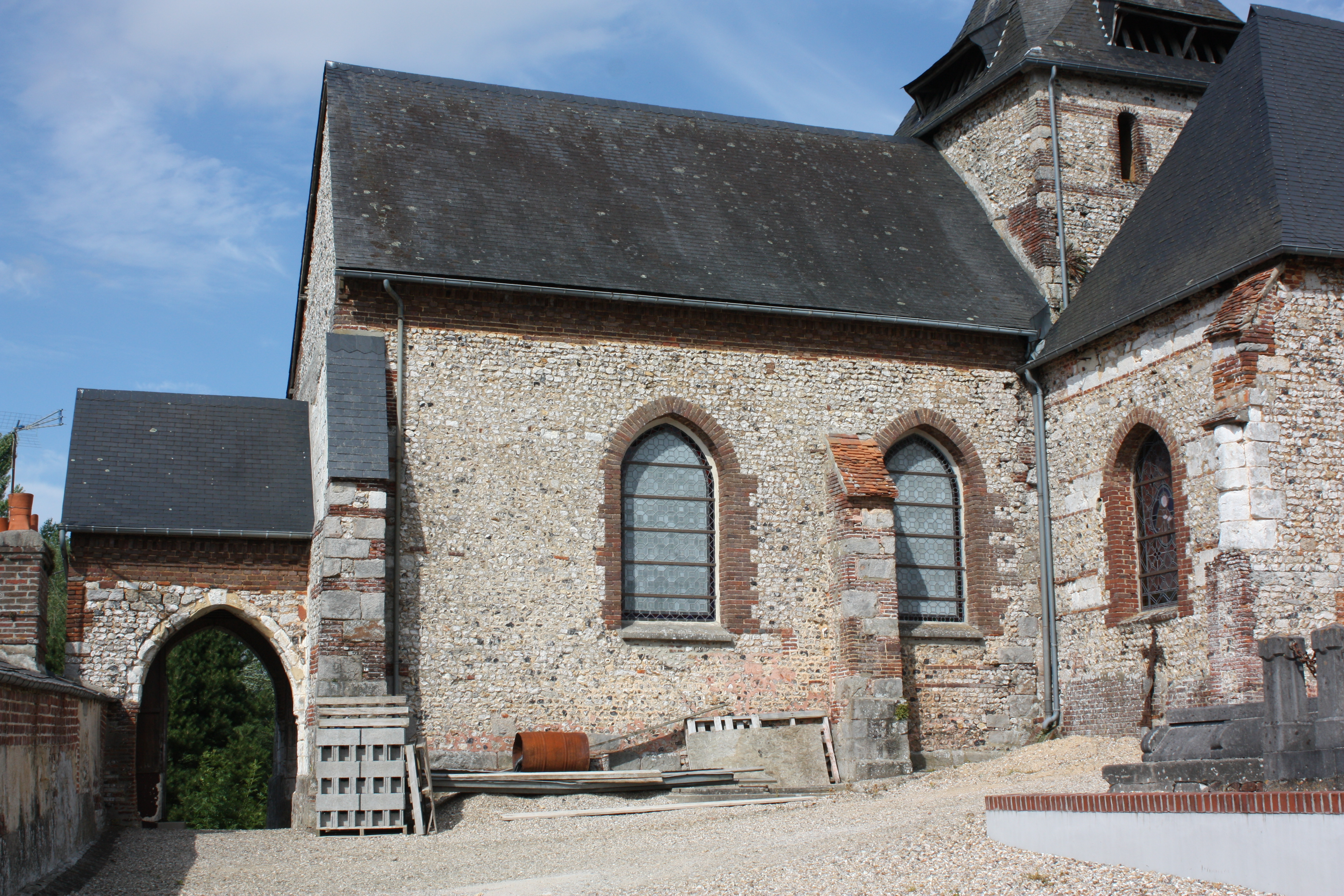
- The church in Wanchy-Capval
- Location of Wanchy-Capval
- Location within France Location within Normandy
- Coordinates: 49°51′28″N 1°21′30″E
- Country: France
- Region: Normandy
- Department: Seine-Maritime
- Arrondissement: Dieppe
- Canton: Neufchâtel-en-Bray
- Intercommunality: Londinières

Government
  - Mayor (2020–2026): Olivier Boinet
- Area^{1}: 19.31 km^{2} (7.46 sq mi)
- Elevation: 60 m (200 ft)
- Highest elevation: 191 m (627 ft)
- Lowest elevation: 57 m (187 ft)
- Population (2023): 326
  - Density: 16.9/km^{2} (43.7/sq mi)
- Time zone: UTC+01:00 (CET)
  - Summer (DST): UTC+02:00 (CEST)
- INSEE/Postal code: 76749 /76660
- ^{1} French Land Register data, which excludes lakes, ponds, glaciers > 1 km^{2} (0.386 sq mi or 247 acres) and river estuaries.

Wanchy-Capval is a commune in the Seine-Maritime department in the Normandy region in north-western France.

== Geography ==
Wanchy-Capval is situated by the banks of the river Eaulne in the Pays de Bray, some 14 miles (23 km) southeast of Dieppe at the junction of the D 920, D 115 and the D 117 roads.

== Population ==
Historical population
Year	Pop.	±% p.a.
1968	448	—
1975	445	−0.10%
1982	397	−1.62%
1990	351	−1.53%
1999	317	−1.13%
2007	342	+0.95%
2012	340	−0.12%
2017	356	+0.92%
2023	326	−1.46%
Source: INSEE

== Places of interest ==
- The church of St. Mellan, dating from the eleventh century.
- The church of St. Pierre, dating from the eleventh century.

== See also ==
- Communes of the Seine-Maritime department
