= Clais =

- Commune
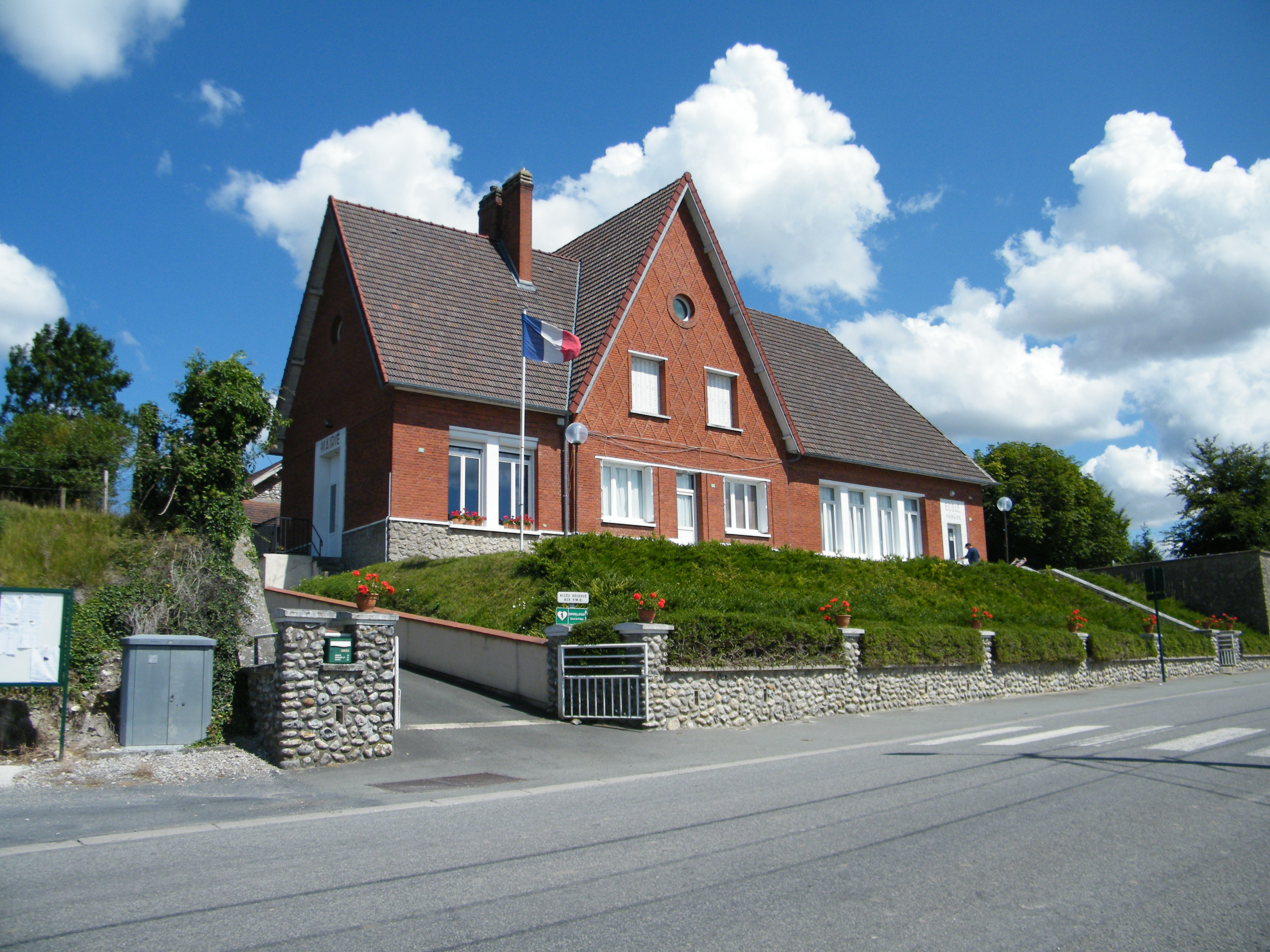
- The town hall and school in Clais
- Location of Clais
- Location within France Location within Normandy
- Coordinates: 49°48′31″N 1°27′01″E
- Country: France
- Region: Normandy
- Department: Seine-Maritime
- Arrondissement: Dieppe
- Canton: Neufchâtel-en-Bray
- Intercommunality: CC Londinières

Government
  - Mayor (2026–32): Vincent Leborgne
- Area^{1}: 12.45 km^{2} (4.81 sq mi)
- Elevation: 98 m (322 ft)
- Highest elevation: 224 m (735 ft)
- Lowest elevation: 86 m (282 ft)
- Population (2023): 264
  - Density: 21.2/km^{2} (54.9/sq mi)
- Time zone: UTC+01:00 (CET)
  - Summer (DST): UTC+02:00 (CEST)
- INSEE/Postal code: 76175 /76660
- ^{1} French Land Register data, which excludes lakes, ponds, glaciers > 1 km^{2} (0.386 sq mi or 247 acres) and river estuaries.

Clais (French pronunciation: [klɛ]) is a commune in the Seine-Maritime department in the Normandy region in northern France.

== Geography ==
A farming village situated by the banks of the river Eaulne in the Pays de Bray, some 24 miles (39 km) southeast of Dieppe, at the junction of the D1314 and the D14 roads.

== Population ==
Historical population
Year	Pop.	±% p.a.
1968	289	—
1975	259	−1.55%
1982	244	−0.85%
1990	209	−1.92%
1999	202	−0.38%
2007	207	+0.31%
2012	237	+2.74%
2017	259	+1.79%
2023	264	+0.32%
Source: INSEE

== Places of interest ==
- The church of St.Martin, dating from the eleventh century.

== See also ==
- Communes of the Seine-Maritime department
