= Communauté de communes de Londinières =

Federation of municipalities in France

Coordinates: 49.83°N 1.40°E

Londinières
- Communauté de communes
- Country: France
- Region: Normandy
- Department: Seine-Maritime
- No. of communes: {{{nbcomm}}}
- Established: 11 December 2000

Government
  - President: Armelle Biloquet
- Area: 194.62 km^{2} (75.14 sq mi)
- Population (2018): 5,255
  - Density: 27.00/km^{2} (69.93/sq mi)
- Website: www.comcom-londinieres.fr

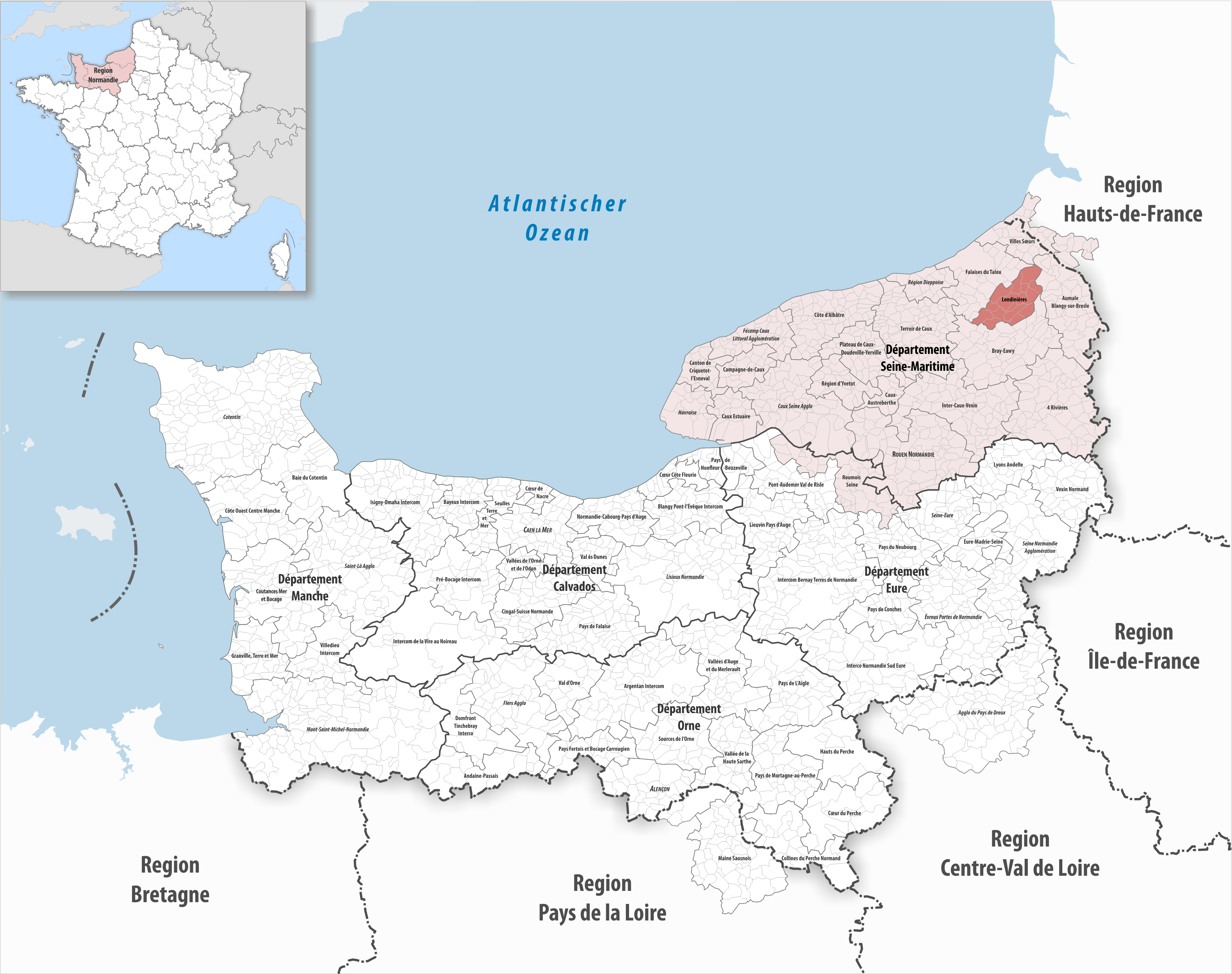
Location of the Londinières Association of Municipalities

The Communauté de communes de Londinières is located in the Seine-Maritime département of the Normandy region of north-western France. It was created on 11 December 2000 and its seat is Londinières. Its area is 194.6 km^{2}, and its population was 5,255 in 2018.

== Composition ==
The communauté de communes consists of the following 16 communes:

- Bailleul-Neuville
- Baillolet
- Bures-en-Bray
- Clais
- Croixdalle
- Fréauville
- Fresnoy-Folny
- Grandcourt
- Londinières
- Osmoy-Saint-Valery
- Preuseville
- Puisenval
- Saint-Pierre-des-Jonquières
- Sainte-Agathe-d'Aliermont
- Smermesnil
- Wanchy-Capval

== See also ==
- Communes of the Seine-Maritime department
