= Georges de Saint-Clair =

French author and sports leader (1845–1910)

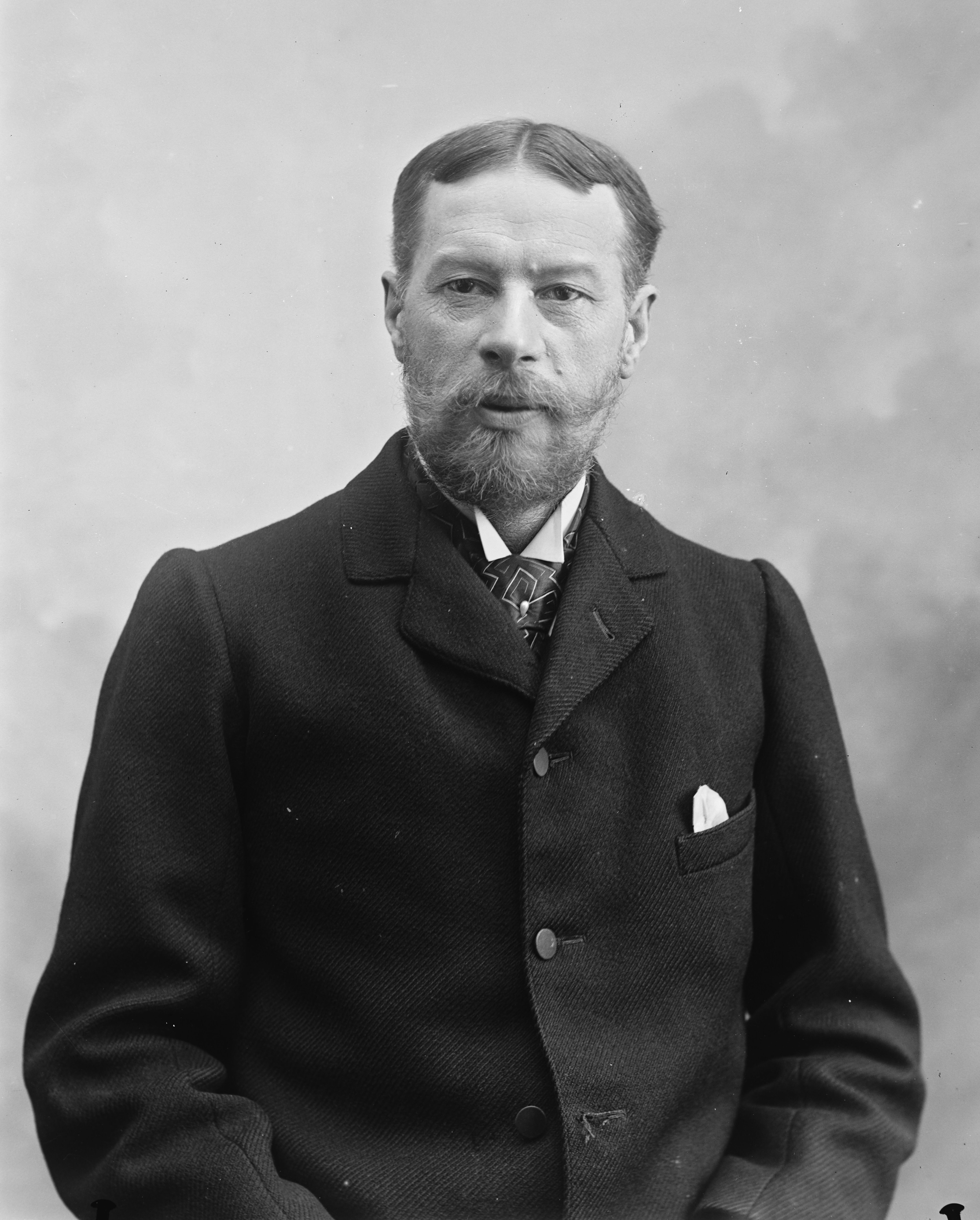
- de Saint-Clair in 1894
- Born: Georges de Saint-Clair Stevenson; 16 February 1845; Plainpalais, Geneva, Switzerland
- Died: 12 February 1910 (aged 64); Paris, France
- Resting place: Cemetery of Saint-Louis
- Citizenship: French
- Occupations: Soldier; Civil engineer; Sports leader; Author; Rugby referee
- Known for: Founding president of the USFSA

Secretary General Racing Club de France
- In office 1884–1890

1st president of the USFSA
- In office 31 January 1889 – 1890
- Succeeded by: Léon de Janzé

Georges de Saint-Clair Stevenson (16 February 1845 – 12 February 1910) was a French author and sports leader who is widely regarded as one of the most important figures in the development of sport in France, founding the forerunner of the Union des Sociétés Françaises de Sports Athlétiques in 1887, and then serving the entity as its first president from 1889 until 1890. He was also a rugby referee.

== Early life and education ==
Georges de Saint-Clair was born in Geneva on 16 February 1845, to a French father, a diplomat, and a Scottish mother, being educated there in the Anglo-Saxon tradition, thus developing a deep interest in sport. As the son of a well-off family, he was sent abroad to complete his studies in Britain, being the first Frenchman admitted to said college, where he spent the next four years, from 1862 to 1866. On his first day there, he was placed between the captain of the rugby team, Charles Gregson, and the vice-president of the Athletic Association, Reginald Brown, who asked him several questions about school life in France and its sports, and while the English were surprised that there was no football or cricket in France, Saint-Clair was surprised that not a word had yet been said about studies.

Gregson then introduced him to rugby and took him to his team, which had won the "Cup" in the inter-collegiate games for three years in a row, and in his first-ever rugby match, Saint-Clair was able to cover about 50 meters without being stopped until he fell just outside the goal line, which resulted in a try that gave them the only goal of the match. He later described this play, stating that "this fast run to which I was not accustomed, with these hooks to the right and left to avoid being grabbed had left me considerably out of breath", but refused to pass the ball to a teammate in order to prove that the French could play.

== Military career ==
During the Franco-Prussian War in 1870, Saint-Clair enlisted for France, distinguishing himself by his courage at Beaune-la-Rolande, Orléans, and Villersexel, before being attached as an orderly official, and standard-bearer of General Gaston de Galliffet. After the signing of peace, he settled permanently in his father's homeland to devote himself fully to the development of sport in France and introduce a taste for physical exercise in said country.

Outside of sports, he was a civil engineer.

== Sporting career ==
=== Racing Club de France ===
In June 1884, Saint-Clair was elected the Secretary General of Racing Club, which had been founded two years earlier by the students and teachers from the Lycée Condorcet in Paris. He structured the club and not only made it known (first articles in Le Figaro in 1885), but also turned it into a serious club, and thus, in late 1884, Racing was officially recognized as a multi-sport club, and the following year, on 21 November 1885, he renamed it to Racing Club de France, to distinguish itself from the Racing Club of Belgium.

Saint-Clair was one of the first defenders of amateurism in France, where foot races modeled on horse racing events had already been endowed with cash prizes since the mid-19th century; he created regulations based on amateurism from across the Channel, which he was one of the few French people to know thanks to his Anglo-Saxon upbringing. This approach put an end to Racing's tournaments with cash prizes, but he had higher ambitions than just his own club, so together with Ernest Demay, he also launched a national campaign to "purify" athletics, and their action was crowned with success and they also ended up obtaining a ban on betting on athletic races. In addition to British regulations, the club also adopted the uniforms and equipment in force in England, and he then took the initiative to remove the pseudonyms in force at the time, (Note: Louis d'or, Charivari, Iroquois, Richelieu, and some of the runners even took on the pseudonyms of horses, such as Queen Mary.) and replaced them with the athletes' surnames, which helped increase the popularity of the athletes, and therefore of the sport. Saint-Clair was, therefore, crucial in laying the foundations of modern sport, being considered the first architect of the development of French sport.

In 1886, Saint-Clair obtained from the Paris municipal council the concession of a plot of land that soon became the famous Croix-Catelan, which allowed the club to install its sports facilities in the heart of the Bois de Boulogne in the 16th arrondissement of Paris, a place that quickly caught the attention of the aristocrats and the French press. That same year, he instigated the holding of the first international athletics meeting there and, on 26 December, organized the first cross-country race on the grounds of the city of Ville-d'Avray.

=== USFSA ===
"For many, the Union was created simply with the aim of developing athletics in France, but its founders had higher ideas. Through games and exercises, we want to create a school where the will is developed and strengthened, a school that makes the man of action, the ones who know how to want, dare, undertake, govern, and be governed."

— Saint-Clair about the creation of the USFSA.

Saint-Clair also established contacts in France and abroad, and on 1 November 1886, he organized a triangular Franco-Anglo-Belgian meeting in Paris, during which he established relations with the AAA (Amateur Athletic Association), which were very useful to him the following year, since on 29 January 1887, they came together to create the Union des Sociétés Françaises de Courses ("Union of French Running Societies"), which brought together the first clubs. On 29 April 1888, USFC organized the first-ever French Athletics Championships, which was held at the Croix-Catelan.

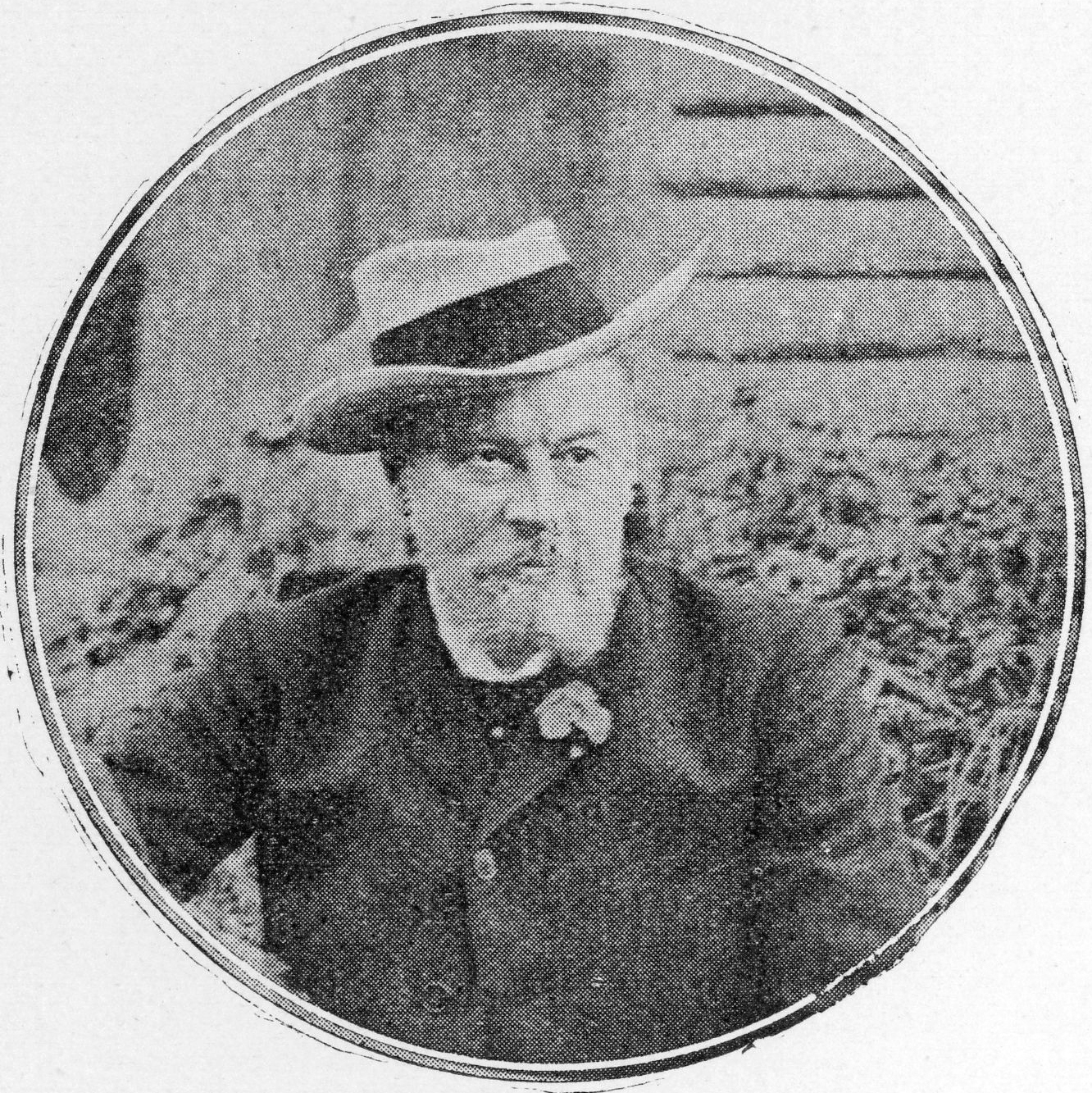
Saint-Clair portrayed in Pierre de Coubertin's 1909 book Une campaigns de vingt-et-un ans.

This entity quickly accepted other sports into its ranks, and two years later, on 31 January 1889, this structure expanded its views by becoming the Union des Sociétés Françaises de Sports Athlétiques ("Union of French Athletic Sports Societies"), the first sports governing body in France. Saint-Clair was elected as its first president, taking charge of a team of young leaders who were on average twenty years younger than him, such as Frantz Reichel, Jules Marcadet, Charles Brennus, and Pierre de Coubertin, with the latter describing him as "his most devoted and intelligent collaborator". Coubertin also went on to create the first French monthly review on athletics La Revue athlétique in 1890, whose first issue published on 25 January 1890, included an article written by Saint-Clair in which he recounted his first game of rugby when he had just joined an English public college in 1862.

However, his wife's poor health forced him to leave Paris abruptly in mid-1890, settling in the provinces and thus gradually breaking off his collaboration with the USFSA and disappearing from the sporting scene, so it then fell to Reichel and Coubertin to continue his work. In 1894, he was a member of Coubertin's team in his quest to create the modern Olympic Games. On 18 March 1894, the 49-year-old Saint-Clair refereed the third final of the French Rugby Union Championship, in which Stade Français claimed a 18–0 victory over Inter-Nos.

== Writing career ==
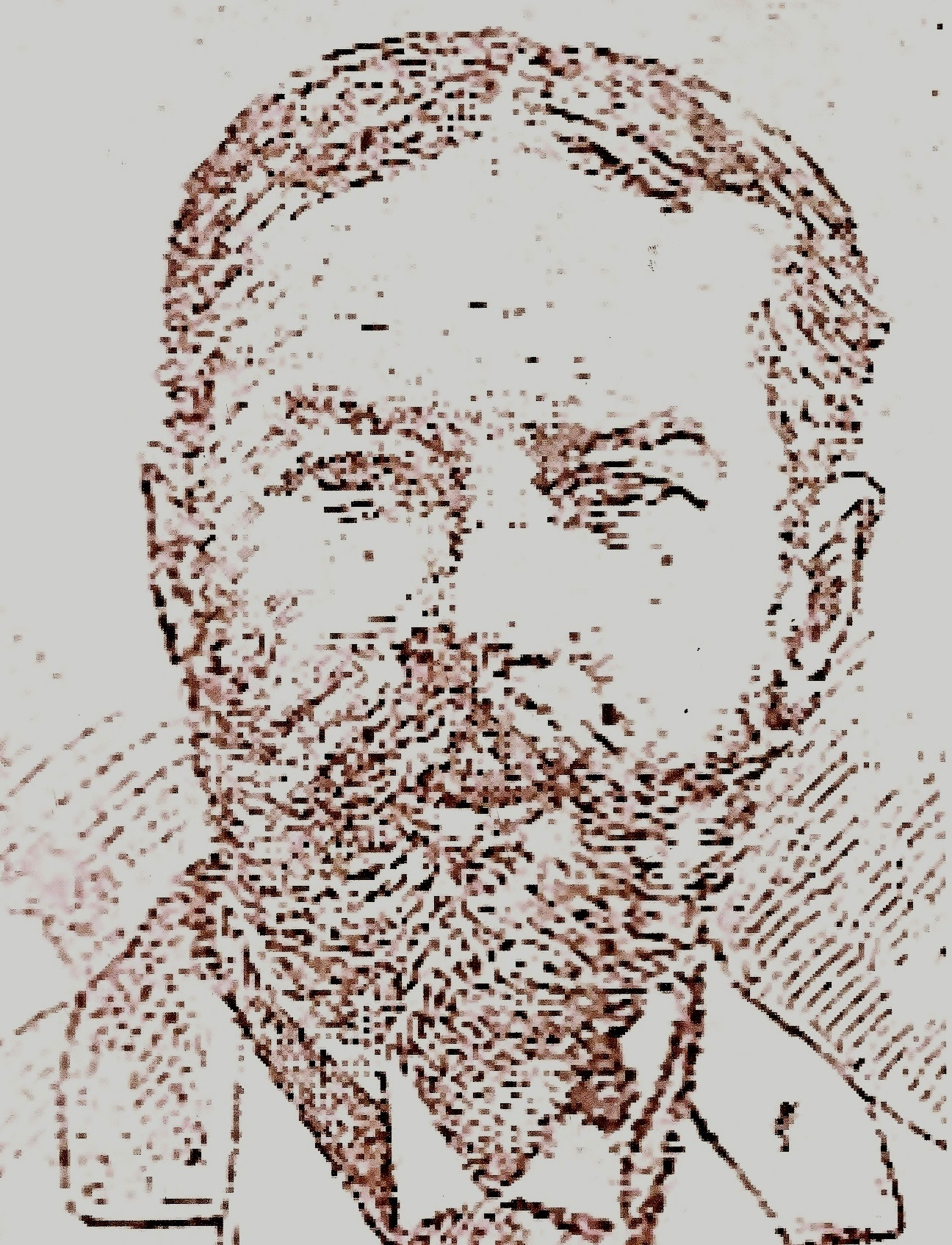
Saint-Clair in 1894.

At the end of the 19th century, Saint-Clair wrote and edited several works on sport, including Les sports athlétiques et les exercices de plein air ("Sports Athletics and Outdoor Exercises"), which he published with P. Arnould in 1887. Ludus pro patria (playing for the fatherland) appears next to the title of this book, which is now considered the first French sports book. In 1890, Saint-Clair published the first French book about the rules of Rugby.

In 1894, Saint-Clair, together with Edouard Saint-Chaffray, published a book called Le rugby en 1894, which was reissued in 2017. In 1895, he published Petite Bibliothèque Athlétique, the first French book entirely devoted to Rugby, which had his portrait on the frontispiece. In that same year, the book Les Sports Athlétiques was published, written by Reichel, Mazzucchelli, and a certain "Eole", which might be a pseudonym of Saint-Clair.

== Later life and death ==
At some point, Saint-Clair was the vice-consul of France in Edinburgh. In January 1907, the Academy of Sports awarded him the title of "founder of athletics in France".

Saint-Clair died in Paris on 12 February 1910, at the age of 64, the victim of a long illness, and his funeral took place in Versailles, where he was buried in the Saint-Louis cemetery, after a ceremony at the Temple des Batignolles. Following his death, the local press stated that he was "the sportsman to whom we can rightly attribute the great athletic movement which, at the present time, seems to be leading new generations". At the time of his death, the USFSA had a thousand clubs and more than 1,500 members.

== Works ==
Les sports athlétiques et les exercices de plein air (1887) Les règles du rugby (1890) Le rugby en 1894 (1894) Petite Bibliothèque Athlétique (1895)
