= Saint-Germain-sur-Eaulne =

- Commune
- Coat of arms
- Location of Saint-Germain-sur-Eaulne
- Location within France Location within Normandy
- Coordinates: 49°45′58″N 1°30′25″E
- Country: France
- Region: Normandy
- Department: Seine-Maritime
- Arrondissement: Dieppe
- Canton: Neufchâtel-en-Bray
- Intercommunality: CC Bray-Eawy

Government
  - Mayor (2026–32): Yves Crevel
- Area^{1}: 8.79 km^{2} (3.39 sq mi)
- Elevation: 112 m (367 ft)
- Highest elevation: 236 m (774 ft)
- Lowest elevation: 109 m (358 ft)
- Population (2023): 229
  - Density: 26.1/km^{2} (67.5/sq mi)
- Time zone: UTC+01:00 (CET)
  - Summer (DST): UTC+02:00 (CEST)
- INSEE/Postal code: 76584 /76270
- ^{1} French Land Register data, which excludes lakes, ponds, glaciers > 1 km^{2} (0.386 sq mi or 247 acres) and river estuaries.

Saint-Germain-sur-Eaulne is a commune in the Seine-Maritime department in the Normandy region in northern France.

== Geography ==
A farming village situated by the banks of the river Eaulne in the Pays de Bray, at the junction of the D60 with the D36 road, some 7 miles (11 km) south of Dieppe. The Amiens branch of the A29 autoroute starts within the commune's borders, at Junction 7 with the A28 autoroute.

== Population ==
Historical population
Year	Pop.	±% p.a.
1968	225	—
1975	221	−0.26%
1982	219	−0.13%
1990	240	+1.15%
1999	235	−0.23%
2007	214	−1.16%
2012	190	−2.35%
2017	207	+1.73%
2023	229	+1.70%
Source: INSEE

== Places of interest ==
- The church of St. Germain, dating from the seventeenth century.
- The ruins of a seventeenth-century chateau.

== See also ==
- Communes of the Seine-Maritime department
