= Smermesnil =

- Commune
- Location of Smermesnil
- Location within France Location within Normandy
- Coordinates: 49°50′32″N 1°28′26″E
- Country: France
- Region: Normandy
- Department: Seine-Maritime
- Arrondissement: Dieppe
- Canton: Neufchâtel-en-Bray
- Intercommunality: CC Londinières

Government
  - Mayor (2026–32): Bruno Grandsire
- Area^{1}: 12.81 km^{2} (4.95 sq mi)
- Elevation: 211 m (692 ft)
- Highest elevation: 218 m (715 ft)
- Lowest elevation: 117 m (384 ft)
- Population (2023): 361
  - Density: 28.2/km^{2} (73.0/sq mi)
- Time zone: UTC+01:00 (CET)
  - Summer (DST): UTC+02:00 (CEST)
- INSEE/Postal code: 76677 /76660
- ^{1} French Land Register data, which excludes lakes, ponds, glaciers > 1 km^{2} (0.386 sq mi or 247 acres) and river estuaries.

Smermesnil (French pronunciation: [smɛʁmenil]) is a commune in the Seine-Maritime department in the Normandy region in northern France.

== Geography ==
A farming commune created from three ancient parishes and situated at the 2nd highest point in the department, between the valleys of the Yères and the Eaulne rivers in the Pays de Bray. The commune is about 17 miles (27 km) southeast of Dieppe at the junction of the D920, D14 and D59 roads.

== Population ==
Historical population
Year	Pop.	±% p.a.
1968	446	—
1975	285	−6.20%
1982	267	−0.93%
1990	218	−2.50%
1999	250	+1.53%
2007	366	+4.88%
2012	421	+2.84%
2017	407	−0.67%
2023	361	−1.98%
Source: INSEE

== Places of interest ==
- The château, built with stone from the ancient abbey de Foucarmont.
- The church of St. Martin, dating from the thirteenth century.
- The church of St. Jean, dating from the sixteenth century.
- The church of St. Madeleine, dating from the sixteenth century.

== See also ==
- Communes of the Seine-Maritime department
