= Ancourt =

- Commune
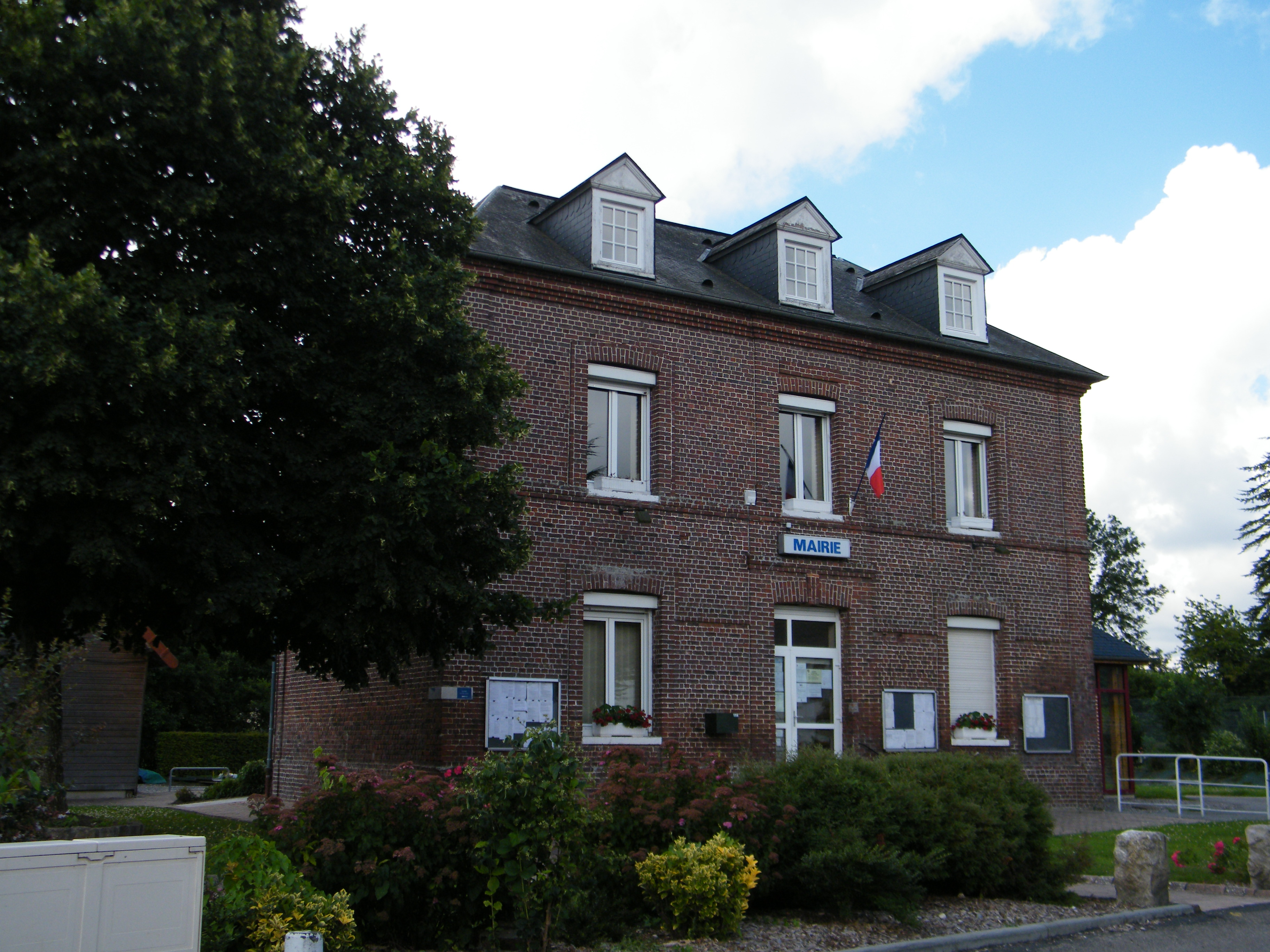
- The town hall in Ancourt
- Location of Ancourt
- Location within France Location within Normandy
- Coordinates: 49°54′38″N 1°11′04″E
- Country: France
- Region: Normandy
- Department: Seine-Maritime
- Arrondissement: Dieppe
- Canton: Dieppe-2
- Intercommunality: CA Région Dieppoise

Government
  - Mayor (2026–32): Christophe Louchel
- Area^{1}: 12.44 km^{2} (4.80 sq mi)
- Elevation: 14 m (46 ft)
- Highest elevation: 130 m (430 ft)
- Lowest elevation: 7 m (23 ft)
- Population (2023): 618
  - Density: 49.7/km^{2} (129/sq mi)
- Time zone: UTC+01:00 (CET)
  - Summer (DST): UTC+02:00 (CEST)
- INSEE/Postal code: 76008 /76370
- ^{1} French Land Register data, which excludes lakes, ponds, glaciers > 1 km^{2} (0.386 sq mi or 247 acres) and river estuaries.

Ancourt (French pronunciation: [ɑ̃kuʁ]) is a commune in the Seine-Maritime department in the Normandy region in northern France.

== Geography ==
A forestry and farming village situated in the Petit-Caux, by the banks of the river Eaulne, some 5 miles (8.0 km) east of Dieppe, at the junction of the D54 and D920 roads.

== Population ==
Historical population
Year	Pop.	±% p.a.
1968	526	—
1975	517	−0.25%
1982	540	+0.62%
1990	621	+1.76%
1999	681	+1.03%
2007	712	+0.56%
2012	709	−0.08%
2017	653	−1.63%
2023	618	−0.91%
Source: INSEE

== Places of interest ==
- The church of St. Saturnin, dating from the sixteenth century.
- The chateau of Pont-Trancard.

== See also ==
- Communes of the Seine-Maritime department
