= Michel Gondinet =

French sports leader and politician

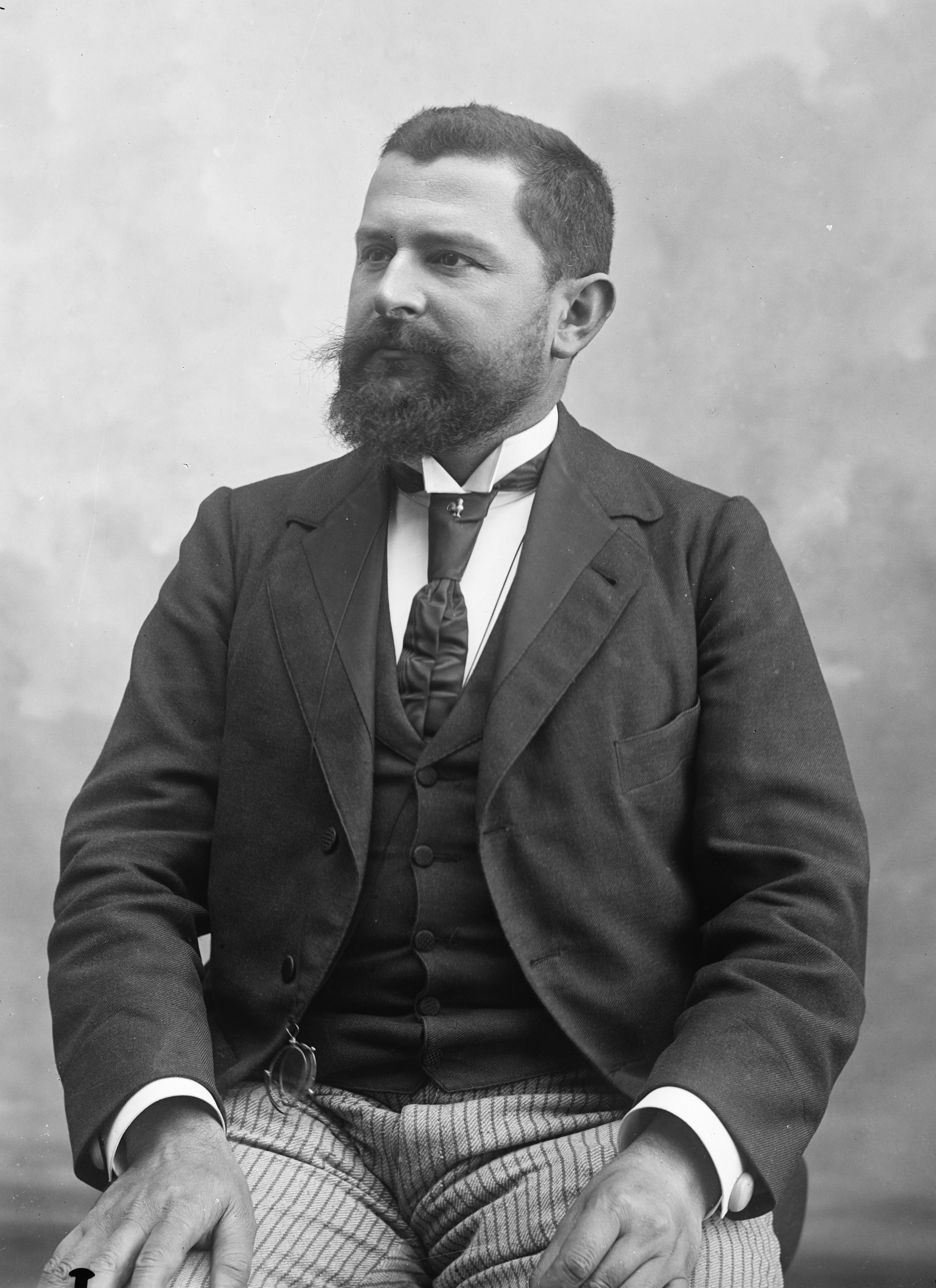
- Michel Gondinet in 1894
- Born: Michel Francis Marie Claude Gondinet; 29 September 1855; Saint-Yrieix-la-Perche, France
- Died: 6 February 1936 (aged 80); Paris, France
- Citizenship: French
- Occupations: Writer; Sports leader
- Known for: President of the USFSA

President of the Racing Club de France
- In office 1891–1902

3rd President of the USFSA
- In office 1891–1892
- Preceded by: Léon de Janzé
- Succeeded by: Léon de Janzé

President of the USFSA
- In office 1893–1894
- Preceded by: Adolphe de Pallissaux
- Succeeded by: Léon de Janzé

Michel Francis Marie Claude Gondinet (29 September 1855 – 6 February 1936) was a French lawyer, writer, and sports leader who was among the founders of Racing Club de France in 1881 and the Union des Sociétés Françaises de Sports Athlétiques (USFSA) in 1889, serving as a president for both entities in the 1890s.

== Early and personal life ==
Michel Gondinet was born in Saint-Yrieix-la-Perche on 29 September 1855, as the second of eight children from the marriage formed by Gaëtan Gondinet (1819–1897) and Félicie de Labrouhe de Laborderie, lady of Faye (1834–1895). He was the great-grandson of Alfred de Vigny and nephew of Edmond Gondinet.

On 28 June 1893, Gondinet married Jeanne Dumesnil (1867–1942) in the 8th arrondissement of Paris, and the couple had five children: Jean (1894–1962), who was awarded a Croix de guerre in the First World War; Marie Louise (1895–1978), Christine (1898–1984), Henri (1902–?), and Edmond. On 29 April 1919, he married for the second time, this time to Élisabeth Letulle in the 15th arrondissement of Paris.

== Sporting career ==
"Gondinet was taught that “the bar wants a whole man”, but he failed to follow this rule; his boundless activity could not be concentrated solely on the noble career of a lawyer; his very lively passion for everything that is good and beautiful could not be satisfied only with the affairs, however numerous and diverse, of the Palace of Justice."

— Fernand de Laborterie in La revue limousine on 15 March 1932.

Gondinet worked as a lawyer at the Paris Appellate court for half a century, from 1881 to 1931. His career there was described as "full of work, delicacy and honor". In addition to his successful career at the Parisian bar, Gondinet was also a great sports enthusiast, organizing some of the first foot races in the country in the hall of the Gare Saint-Lazare. In 1881, he was among the founders of the Racing Club de France, and when he became its president in 1890, the club already had 200 members, holding that position for over a decade, until 1901, and again from 1904 to 1908.

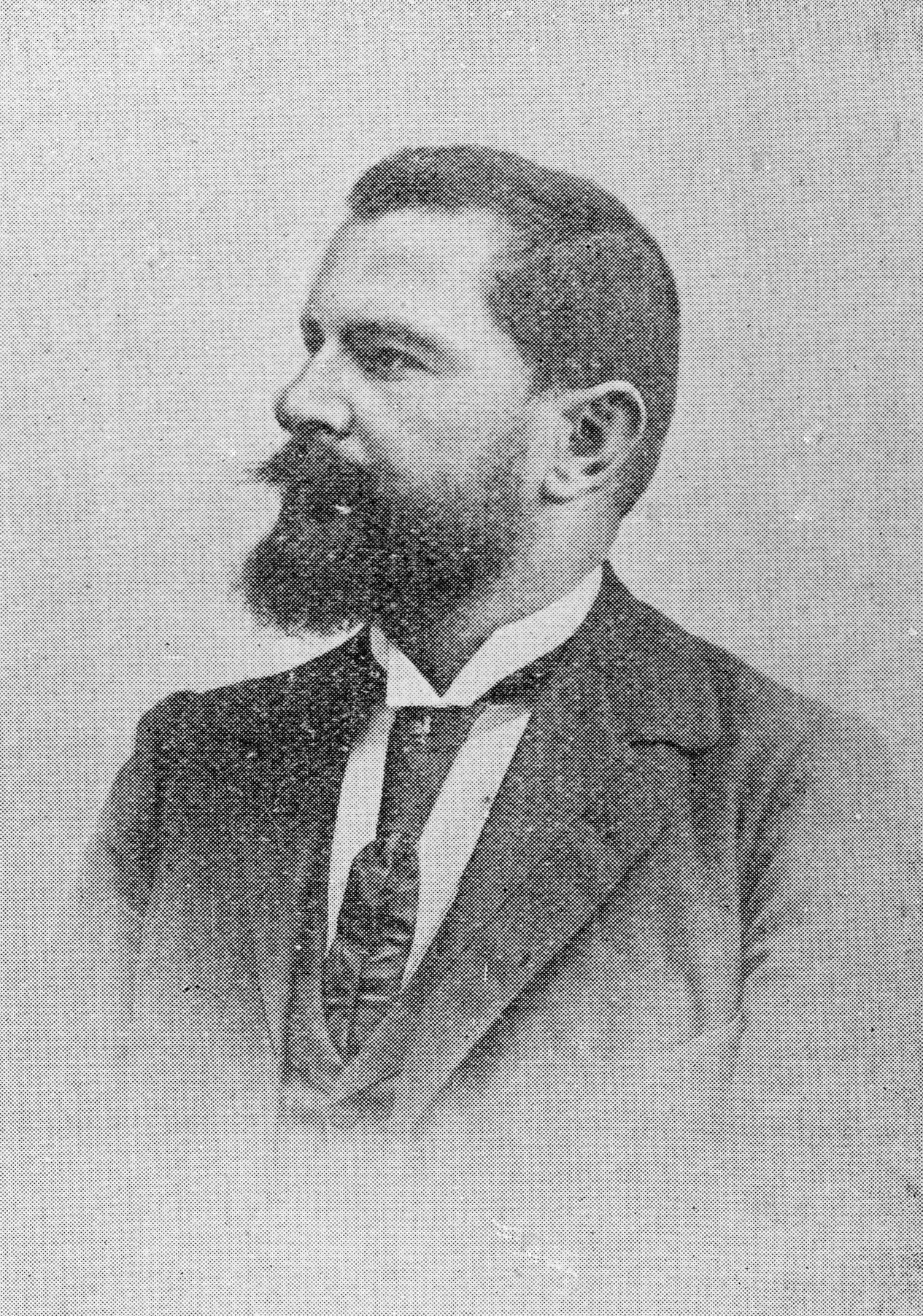
Gondinet portrayed in Pierre de Coubertin's 1909 book Une campaigns de vingt-et-un ans.

In 1889, he was one of the founding members of the USFSA, which he presided over on two occasions, in 1891–92, and again in 1893–94, the year in which Gondinet headed the commission on amateur issues of the First Olympic Congress, organized by Pierre de Coubertin at the Sorbonne University to officially revive the modern Olympic Games and to found the International Olympic Committee (IOC).

On 3 April 1893, Gondinet was the captain of the first French rugby team to play a match on British soil, which ended in a loss to Rosslyn Park in London. In 1900, he was a member of the Higher Commission for Physical Exercises at the Ministry of National Education, serving as a deputy delegate for athletic sports.

== Writing career ==
During his career, Gondinet wrote some literary works, focusing on law, his hometown, and his family genealogy.

Gondinet also devoted much of his spare time to the beautification of his hometown of Saint-Yrieix, where he went every year to take his vacation, even founding the Society of "Friends of Saint-Yrieix".

== Death ==
Gondinet died in Paris on 6 February 1936, at the age of 80.

== Works ==
- De la preuve par témoins, en droit romain et en droit français ("On Evidence by Witnesses in Roman and French Law") (1876)
- De l'Exercice par les créanciers des droits et actions du débiteu ("On the Exercise by Creditors of the Rights and Actions of the Debtor") (1880)
- L'Héritier donataire qui renonce à la succession peut-il retenir sur les biens donnés, non seulement la quotité disponible mais encore sa part dans la réserve (1881)
- L'Embellissement De Saint-Yrieix Et "Les Amis De Saint-Yrieix" (1926)
- Histoire et généalogie de la famille Gondinet, 1400-1933 (1933)
- An oublié Héros. Le Lieutenant-général Yrieix Masgontier de Laubanie (1641-1706) et le Grand siège de Landau (1704) (1928)
- Pardoux Gondinet, médecin d'Anne d'Autriche (1617-1679): son inventoire ("Pardoux Gondinet, doctor to Anne of Austria (1617-1679): his inventory") (1930)

Note: All of these books were published in Paris.
