= Bures-en-Bray =

- Commune
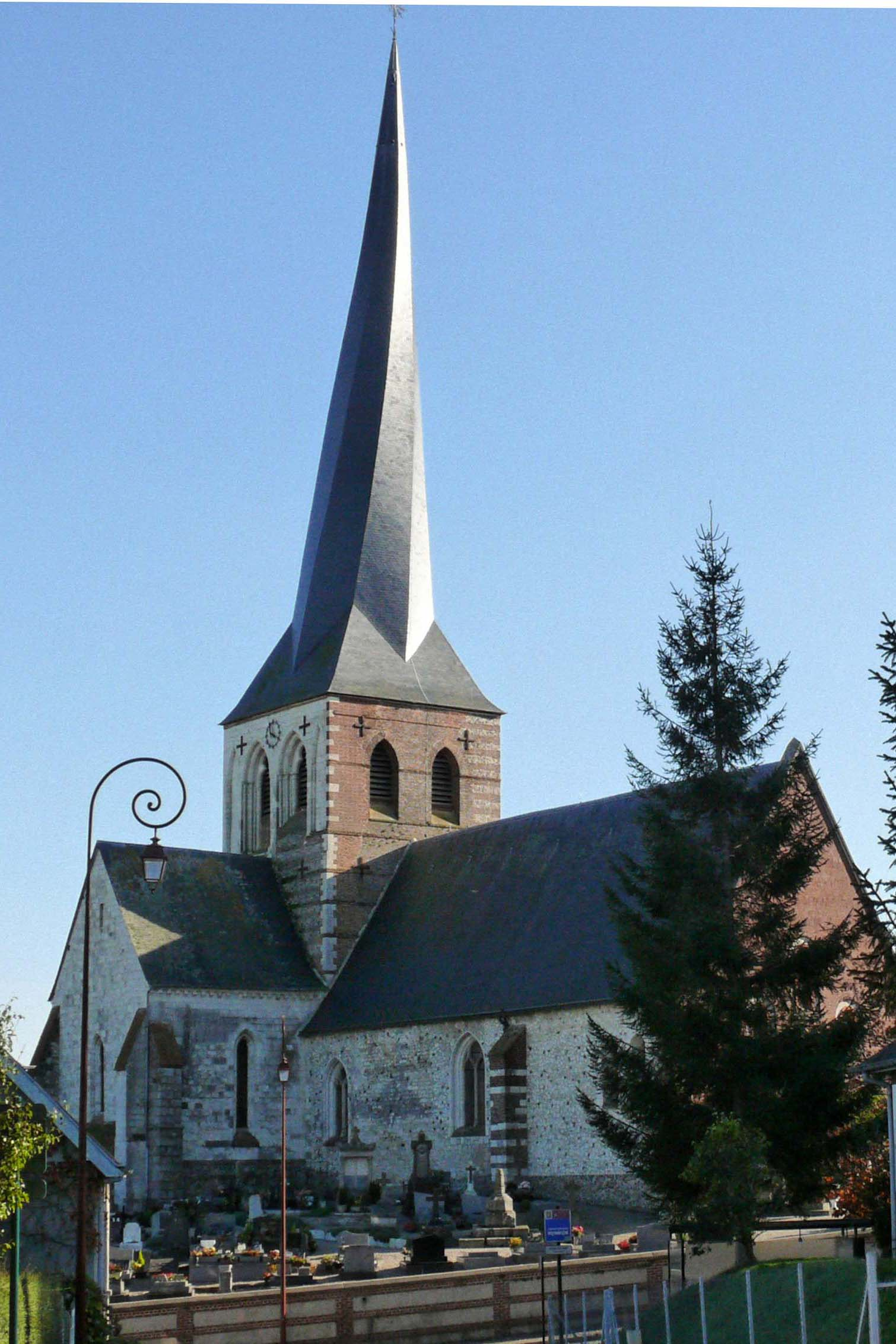
- The church in Bures-en-Bray
- Location of Bures-en-Bray
- Location within France Location within Normandy
- Coordinates: 49°46′44″N 1°20′09″E
- Country: France
- Region: Normandy
- Department: Seine-Maritime
- Arrondissement: Dieppe
- Canton: Neufchâtel-en-Bray
- Intercommunality: CC Londinières

Government
  - Mayor (2026–32): Jacky Lévêque
- Area^{1}: 10.99 km^{2} (4.24 sq mi)
- Elevation: 83 m (272 ft)
- Highest elevation: 201 m (659 ft)
- Lowest elevation: 47 m (154 ft)
- Population (2023): 302
  - Density: 27.5/km^{2} (71.2/sq mi)
- Time zone: UTC+01:00 (CET)
  - Summer (DST): UTC+02:00 (CEST)
- INSEE/Postal code: 76148 /76660
- Website: www.buresenbray.fr
- ^{1} French Land Register data, which excludes lakes, ponds, glaciers > 1 km^{2} (0.386 sq mi or 247 acres) and river estuaries.

Bures-en-Bray (French pronunciation: [byʁ ɑ̃ bʁɛ], literally Bures in Bray) is a commune in the Seine-Maritime department in the Normandy region in northern France.

== Geography ==
A farming village situated in the Pays de Bray, 20 miles (32 km) southeast of Dieppe, at the junction of the D1 with the D114 and D12 roads. The river Béthune flows through the middle of the village.

== Population ==
Historical population
Year	Pop.	±% p.a.
1968	434	—
1975	343	−3.31%
1982	301	−1.85%
1990	318	+0.69%
1999	266	−1.96%
2007	316	+2.18%
2012	326	+0.63%
2017	323	−0.18%
2023	302	−1.11%
Source: INSEE

== Places of interest ==
- The church of St. Aignan, dating from the twelfth century.
- The sixteenth century manorhouse de Tourpes.
- The motte of a feudal castle from the twelfth century.

== See also ==
- Communes of the Seine-Maritime department
