= Fresnoy-Folny =

- Commune
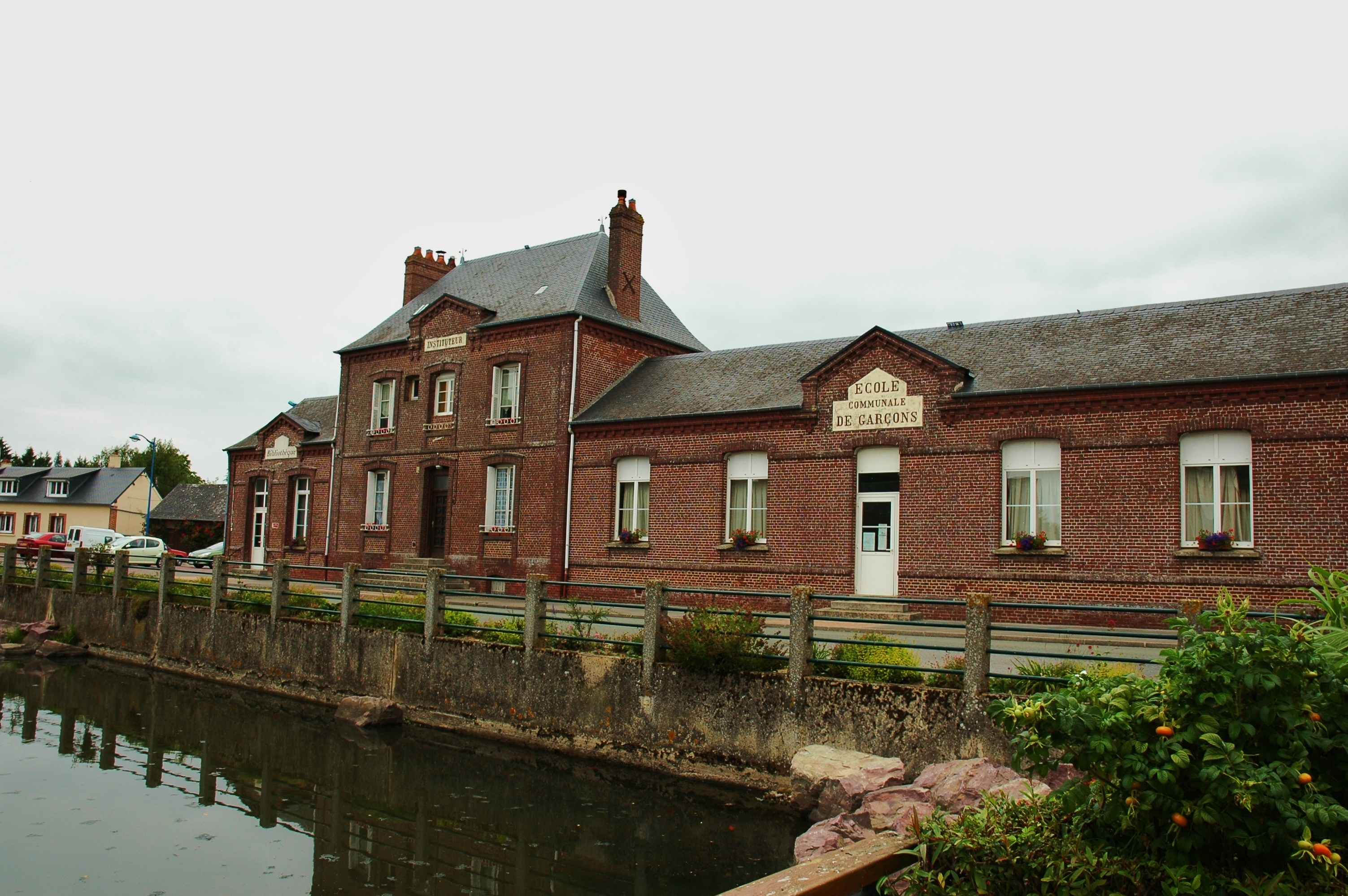
- The town hall and school in Fresnoy-Folny
- Location of Fresnoy-Folny
- Location within France Location within Normandy
- Coordinates: 49°53′21″N 1°25′46″E
- Country: France
- Region: Normandy
- Department: Seine-Maritime
- Arrondissement: Dieppe
- Canton: Neufchâtel-en-Bray
- Intercommunality: CC de Londinières

Government
  - Mayor (2020–2026): Gilbert Debure
- Area^{1}: 13.12 km^{2} (5.07 sq mi)
- Elevation: 180 m (590 ft)
- Highest elevation: 203 m (666 ft)
- Lowest elevation: 109 m (358 ft)
- Population (2023): 683
  - Density: 52.1/km^{2} (135/sq mi)
- Time zone: UTC+01:00 (CET)
  - Summer (DST): UTC+02:00 (CEST)
- INSEE/Postal code: 76286 /76660
- ^{1} French Land Register data, which excludes lakes, ponds, glaciers > 1 km^{2} (0.386 sq mi or 247 acres) and river estuaries.

Fresnoy-Folny is a commune in the Seine-Maritime department in the Normandy region in north-western France.

== Geography ==
A farming village situated in the Pays de Bray, some 15 miles (24 km) east of Dieppe, at the junction of the D 1314, D 26, D 115 and the D 149 roads.

== Population ==
Historical population
| Year | Pop. | ±% p.a. |
|---|---|---|
| 1968 | 592 | — |
| 1975 | 584 | −0.19% |
| 1982 | 574 | −0.25% |
| 1990 | 610 | +0.76% |
| 1999 | 627 | +0.31% |
| 2007 | 667 | +0.78% |
| 2012 | 709 | +1.23% |
| 2017 | 699 | −0.28% |
| 2023 | 683 | −0.39% |
Source: INSEE

== Places of interest ==
- The nineteenth century church of Notre-Dame at Fresnoy.
- The church of St.Martin at Folny, dating from the sixteenth century.

== See also ==
- Communes of the Seine-Maritime department
