= Londinières =

- Commune
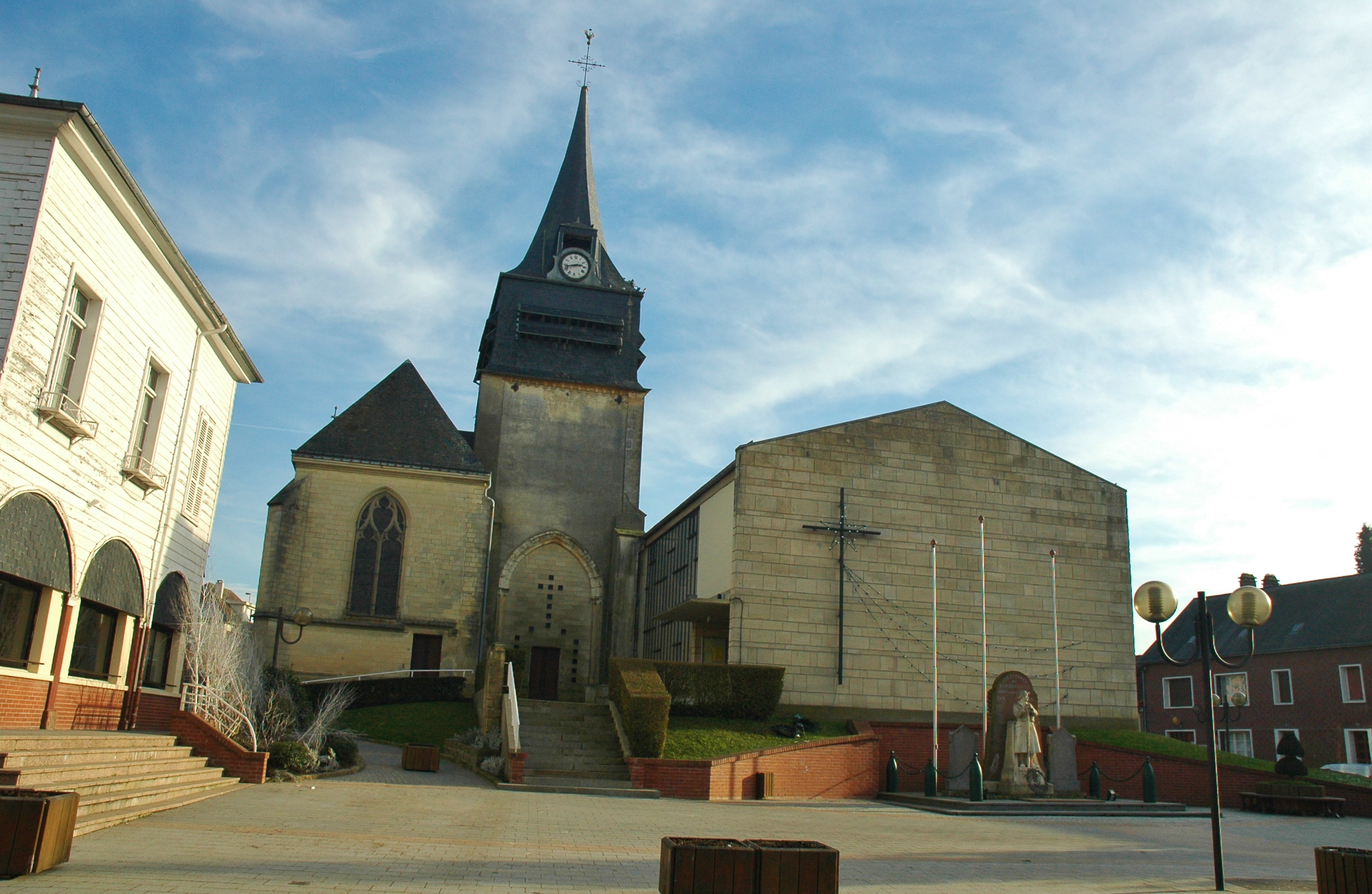
- The church in Londinières
- Location of Londinières
- Location within France Location within Normandy
- Coordinates: 49°49′57″N 1°24′10″E
- Country: France
- Region: Normandy
- Department: Seine-Maritime
- Arrondissement: Dieppe
- Canton: Neufchâtel-en-Bray
- Intercommunality: CC Londinières

Government
  - Mayor (2026–32): Armelle Biloquet
- Area^{1}: 18.79 km^{2} (7.25 sq mi)
- Elevation: 72 m (236 ft)
- Highest elevation: 203 m (666 ft)
- Lowest elevation: 63 m (207 ft)
- Population (2023): 1,234
  - Density: 65.67/km^{2} (170.1/sq mi)
- Time zone: UTC+01:00 (CET)
  - Summer (DST): UTC+02:00 (CEST)
- INSEE/Postal code: 76392 /76660
- ^{1} French Land Register data, which excludes lakes, ponds, glaciers > 1 km^{2} (0.386 sq mi or 247 acres) and river estuaries.

Londinières (French pronunciation: [lɔ̃dinjɛʁ]) is a commune in the Seine-Maritime department in the Normandy region in northern France.

== Geography ==
A small farming town with a light industry situated by the banks of the river Eaulne in the Pays de Bray, some 16 miles (26 km) southeast of Dieppe at the junction of the D920, the D12, D117 and the D1314 roads.

== Population ==
Historical population
Year	Pop.	±% p.a.
1968	1,221	—
1975	1,170	−0.61%
1982	1,166	−0.05%
1990	1,119	−0.51%
1999	1,158	+0.38%
2007	1,199	+0.44%
2012	1,302	+1.66%
2017	1,263	−0.61%
2023	1,234	−0.39%
Source: INSEE

== Places of interest ==
- The church, dating from the sixteenth century.
- The nineteenth century Hôtel de Ville.
- The eighteenth century chapel of Saint-Melaine at Boissay

== See also ==
- Communes of the Seine-Maritime department
