= Sainte-Agathe-d'Aliermont =

- Commune
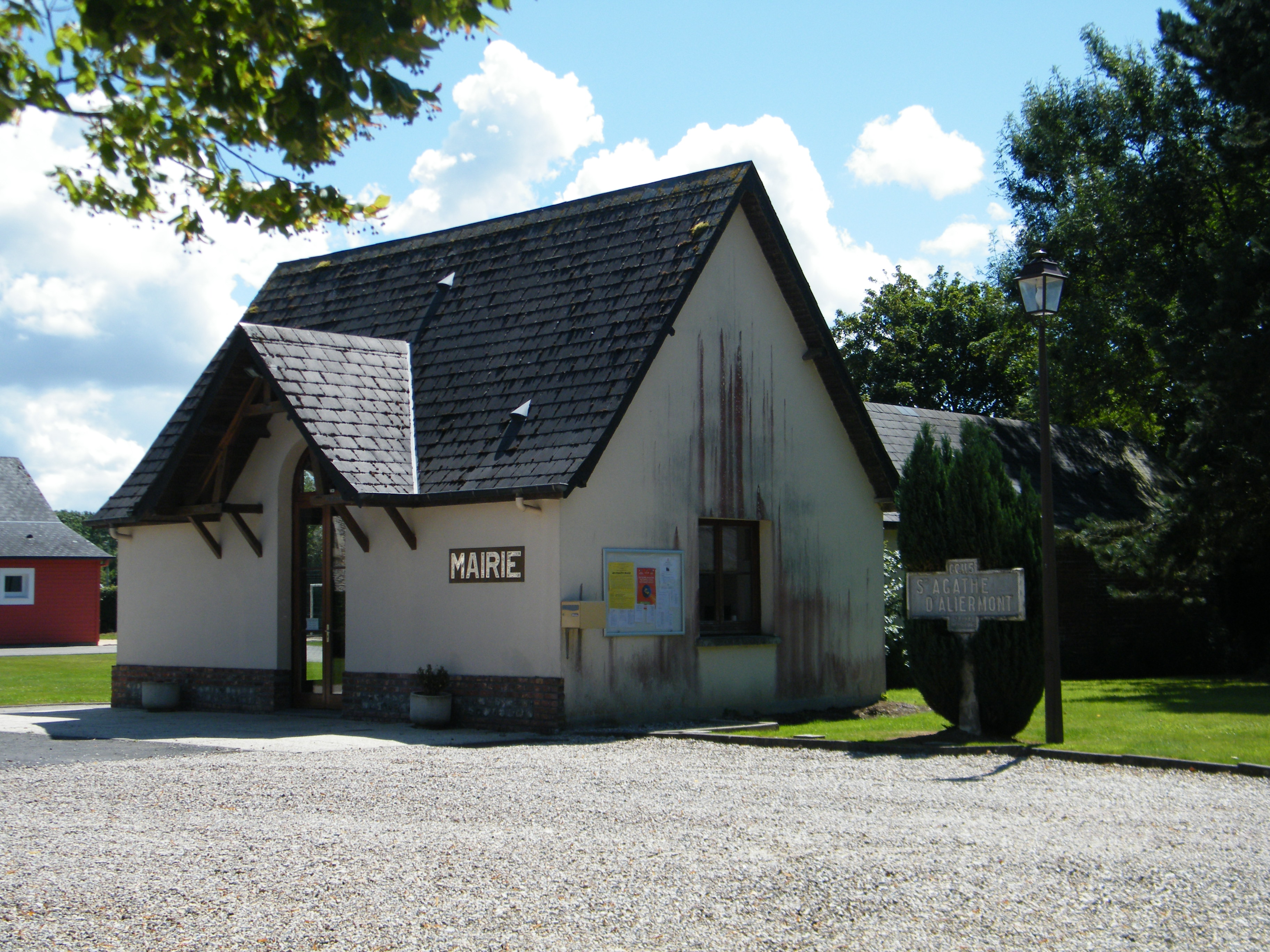
- The town hall in Sainte-Agathe d'Aliermont
- Location of Sainte-Agathe-d'Aliermont
- Location within France Location within Normandy
- Coordinates: 49°49′39″N 1°19′53″E
- Country: France
- Region: Normandy
- Department: Seine-Maritime
- Arrondissement: Dieppe
- Canton: Neufchâtel-en-Bray
- Intercommunality: CC Londinières

Government
  - Mayor (2026–32): Martial Pépin
- Area^{1}: 7.97 km^{2} (3.08 sq mi)
- Elevation: 185 m (607 ft)
- Highest elevation: 197 m (646 ft)
- Lowest elevation: 85 m (279 ft)
- Population (2023): 304
  - Density: 38.1/km^{2} (98.8/sq mi)
- Time zone: UTC+01:00 (CET)
  - Summer (DST): UTC+02:00 (CEST)
- INSEE/Postal code: 76553 /76660
- ^{1} French Land Register data, which excludes lakes, ponds, glaciers > 1 km^{2} (0.386 sq mi or 247 acres) and river estuaries.

Sainte-Agathe-d'Aliermont (French pronunciation: [sɛ̃t aɡat daljɛʁmɔ̃]) is a commune in the Seine-Maritime department in the Normandy region in northern France.

== Geography ==
Sainte-Agathe-d'Aliermont is a farming village situated in the Pays de Bray, some 11 miles (18 km) southeast of Dieppe at the junction of the D56 and the D115 roads.

== Population ==
Historical population
Year	Pop.	±% p.a.
1968	234	—
1975	256	+1.29%
1982	247	−0.51%
1990	257	+0.50%
1999	291	+1.39%
2007	309	+0.75%
2012	319	+0.64%
2017	310	−0.57%
2023	304	−0.33%
Source: INSEE

== Places of interest ==
- The chapel of St. Charles at Beauval.
- The church of St. Agathe, dating from the thirteenth century.

== See also ==
- Communes of the Seine-Maritime department
