= Osmoy-Saint-Valery =

- Commune
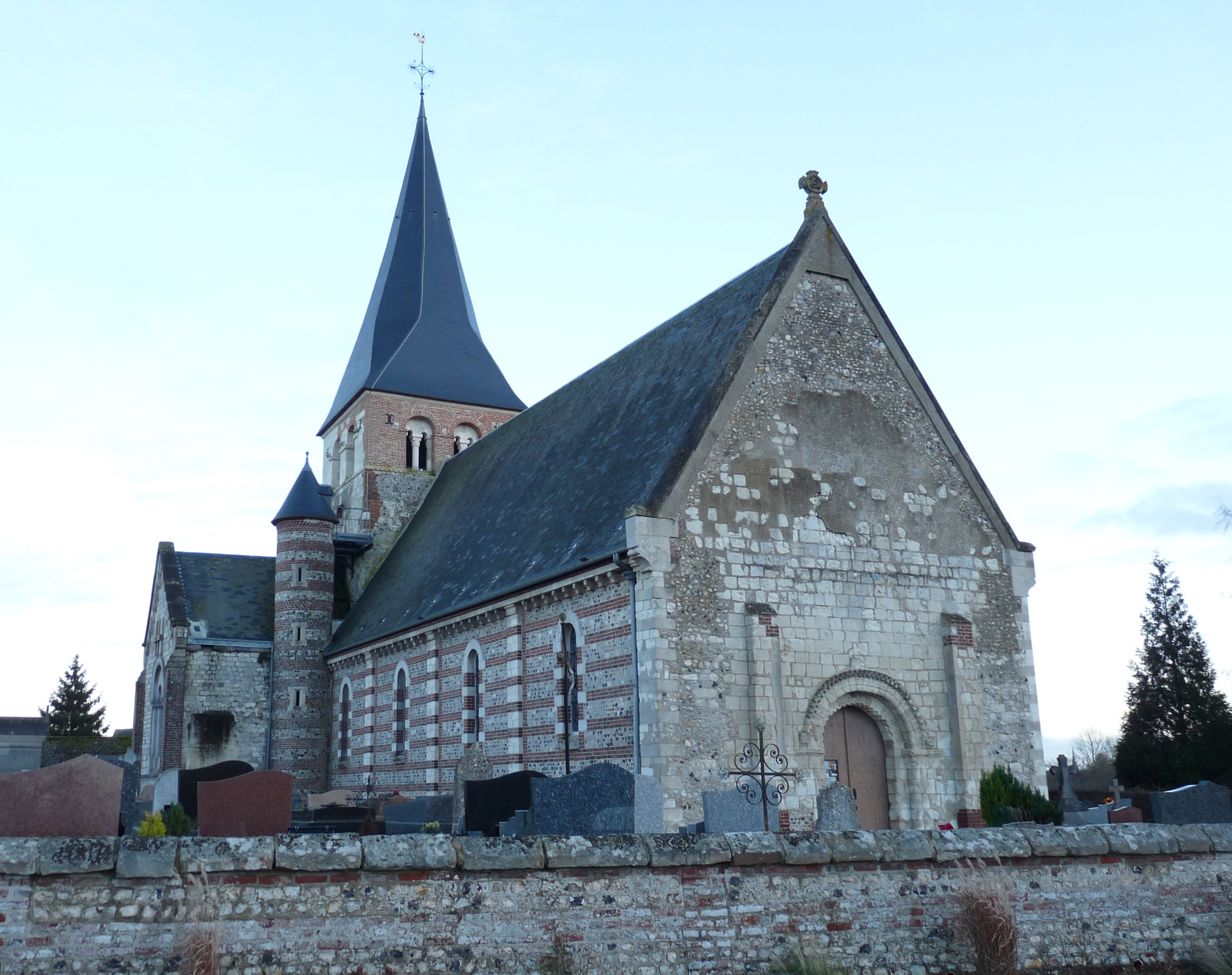
- Notre-Dame church in Osmoy
- Location of Osmoy-Saint-Valery
- Location within France Location within Normandy
- Coordinates: 49°47′50″N 1°19′23″E
- Country: France
- Region: Normandy
- Department: Seine-Maritime
- Arrondissement: Dieppe
- Canton: Neufchâtel-en-Bray
- Intercommunality: CC de Londinières

Government
  - Mayor (2020–2026): Marie-José Bourgeois
- Area^{1}: 16.21 km^{2} (6.26 sq mi)
- Elevation: 56 m (184 ft)
- Highest elevation: 193 m (633 ft)
- Lowest elevation: 40 m (130 ft)
- Population (2023): 312
  - Density: 19.2/km^{2} (49.9/sq mi)
- Time zone: UTC+01:00 (CET)
  - Summer (DST): UTC+02:00 (CEST)
- INSEE/Postal code: 76487 /76660
- ^{1} French Land Register data, which excludes lakes, ponds, glaciers > 1 km^{2} (0.386 sq mi or 247 acres) and river estuaries.

Osmoy-Saint-Valery is a commune in the Seine-Maritime department in the Normandy region in north-western France.

== Geography ==
A farming village situated by the banks of the river Béthune in the Pays de Bray at the junction of the D 1 and the D 77 roads, some 15 miles (24 km) southeast of Dieppe.

== History ==
Commune created in 1823 by the fusion of the three communes of Maintru, Osmoy and Saint-Valery-sous-Bures.

== Population ==
Historical population

Year	Pop.	±% p.a.
1831	607	—
1846	613	+0.07%
1872	464	−1.07%
1901	419	−0.35%
1926	442	+0.21%
1946	433	−0.10%
1962	360	−1.15%
1968	324	−1.74%

Year	Pop.	±% p.a.
1975	332	+0.35%
1982	293	−1.77%
1990	299	+0.25%
1999	310	+0.40%
2007	331	+0.82%
2012	336	+0.30%
2017	324	−0.72%
2023	312	−0.63%

Source: EHESS and INSEE (1968–2023)

== Places of interest ==
- The church of Notre-Dame, dating from the twelfth century.
- The chapel at Maintru.
- A sixteenth-century stone cross.
- The manorhouse de La Valouine, built in 1602 by the seigneurs de Ricarville.

== See also ==
- Communes of the Seine-Maritime department
