= Puisenval =

- Commune
- Location of Puisenval
- Location within France Location within Normandy
- Coordinates: 49°53′07″N 1°28′19″E
- Country: France
- Region: Normandy
- Department: Seine-Maritime
- Arrondissement: Dieppe
- Canton: Neufchâtel-en-Bray
- Intercommunality: CC Londinières

Government
  - Mayor (2020–2026): Sabine Ledue
- Area^{1}: 4.88 km^{2} (1.88 sq mi)
- Elevation: 110 m (360 ft)
- Highest elevation: 197 m (646 ft)
- Lowest elevation: 100 m (330 ft)
- Population (2023): 35
  - Density: 7.2/km^{2} (19/sq mi)
- Time zone: UTC+01:00 (CET)
  - Summer (DST): UTC+02:00 (CEST)
- INSEE/Postal code: 76512 /76660
- ^{1} French Land Register data, which excludes lakes, ponds, glaciers > 1 km^{2} (0.386 sq mi or 247 acres) and river estuaries.

Puisenval (French pronunciation: [pɥizɑ̃val]) is a commune in the Seine-Maritime department in the Normandy region in northern France.

== Geography ==
Puisenval is a tiny farming village situated in the Pays de Bray on the D26 road, some 19 miles (31 km) southeast of Dieppe.

== Population ==
Historical population
Year	Pop.	±% p.a.
1968	63	—
1975	47	−4.10%
1982	38	−2.99%
1990	35	−1.02%
1999	23	−4.56%
2007	26	+1.54%
2012	28	+1.49%
2017	25	−2.24%
2023	35	+5.77%
Source: INSEE

== Places of interest ==
- The church of St Nicholas, dating from the eleventh century.

== See also ==
- Communes of the Seine-Maritime department
