= Preuseville =

- Commune
- Location of Preuseville
- Location within France Location within Normandy
- Coordinates: 49°52′16″N 1°31′00″E
- Country: France
- Region: Normandy
- Department: Seine-Maritime
- Arrondissement: Dieppe
- Canton: Neufchâtel-en-Bray
- Intercommunality: CC Londinières

Government
  - Mayor (2026–32): Cédric Nenot
- Area^{1}: 9.05 km^{2} (3.49 sq mi)
- Elevation: 195 m (640 ft)
- Highest elevation: 197 m (646 ft)
- Lowest elevation: 85 m (279 ft)
- Population (2023): 162
  - Density: 17.9/km^{2} (46.4/sq mi)
- Time zone: UTC+01:00 (CET)
  - Summer (DST): UTC+02:00 (CEST)
- INSEE/Postal code: 76511 /76660
- ^{1} French Land Register data, which excludes lakes, ponds, glaciers > 1 km^{2} (0.386 sq mi or 247 acres) and river estuaries.

Preuseville (French pronunciation: [pʁøzvil]) is a commune in the Seine-Maritime department in the Normandy region in northern France.

== Geography ==
A small farming village situated in the Pays de Bray at the junction of the D26 and the D214 roads, some 19 miles (31 km) east of Dieppe.

== Population ==
Historical population
Year	Pop.	±% p.a.
1968	255	—
1975	222	−1.96%
1982	186	−2.50%
1990	160	−1.86%
1999	147	−0.94%
2007	146	−0.09%
2012	126	−2.90%
2017	137	+1.69%
2023	162	+2.83%
Source: INSEE

== Places of interest ==
- The church of St.Jean-Baptiste, dating from the eighteenth century.
- The church of Notre-Dame, dating from the thirteenth century.

== See also ==
- Communes of the Seine-Maritime department
