= Croixdalle =

- Commune
- Location of Croixdalle
- Location within France Location within Normandy
- Coordinates: 49°48′55″N 1°21′51″E
- Country: France
- Region: Normandy
- Department: Seine-Maritime
- Arrondissement: Dieppe
- Canton: Neufchâtel-en-Bray
- Intercommunality: CC Londinières

Government
  - Mayor (2026–32): Jean-Paul Martel
- Area^{1}: 11 km^{2} (4.2 sq mi)
- Elevation: 185 m (607 ft)
- Highest elevation: 216 m (709 ft)
- Lowest elevation: 80 m (260 ft)
- Population (2023): 338
  - Density: 31/km^{2} (80/sq mi)
- Time zone: UTC+01:00 (CET)
  - Summer (DST): UTC+02:00 (CEST)
- INSEE/Postal code: 76202 /76660
- ^{1} French Land Register data, which excludes lakes, ponds, glaciers > 1 km^{2} (0.386 sq mi or 247 acres) and river estuaries.

Croixdalle (French pronunciation: [kʁwadal]) is a commune in the Seine-Maritime department in the Normandy region in northern France.

== Geography ==
A forestry and farming village situated in the Pays de Bray, some 16 miles (26 km) southeast of Dieppe, at the junction of the D17 and the D56 roads.

== Population ==
Historical population
Year	Pop.	±% p.a.
1968	234	—
1975	224	−0.62%
1982	238	+0.87%
1990	232	−0.32%
1999	230	−0.10%
2007	208	−1.25%
2012	231	+2.12%
2017	307	+5.85%
2023	338	+1.62%
Source: INSEE

== Places of interest ==
- The church of St. Etienne, dating from the thirteenth century.
- The manorhouse de Beauval.
- The ruins of a Roman villa.

== See also ==
- Communes of the Seine-Maritime department
