= Saint-Pierre-des-Jonquières =

- Commune
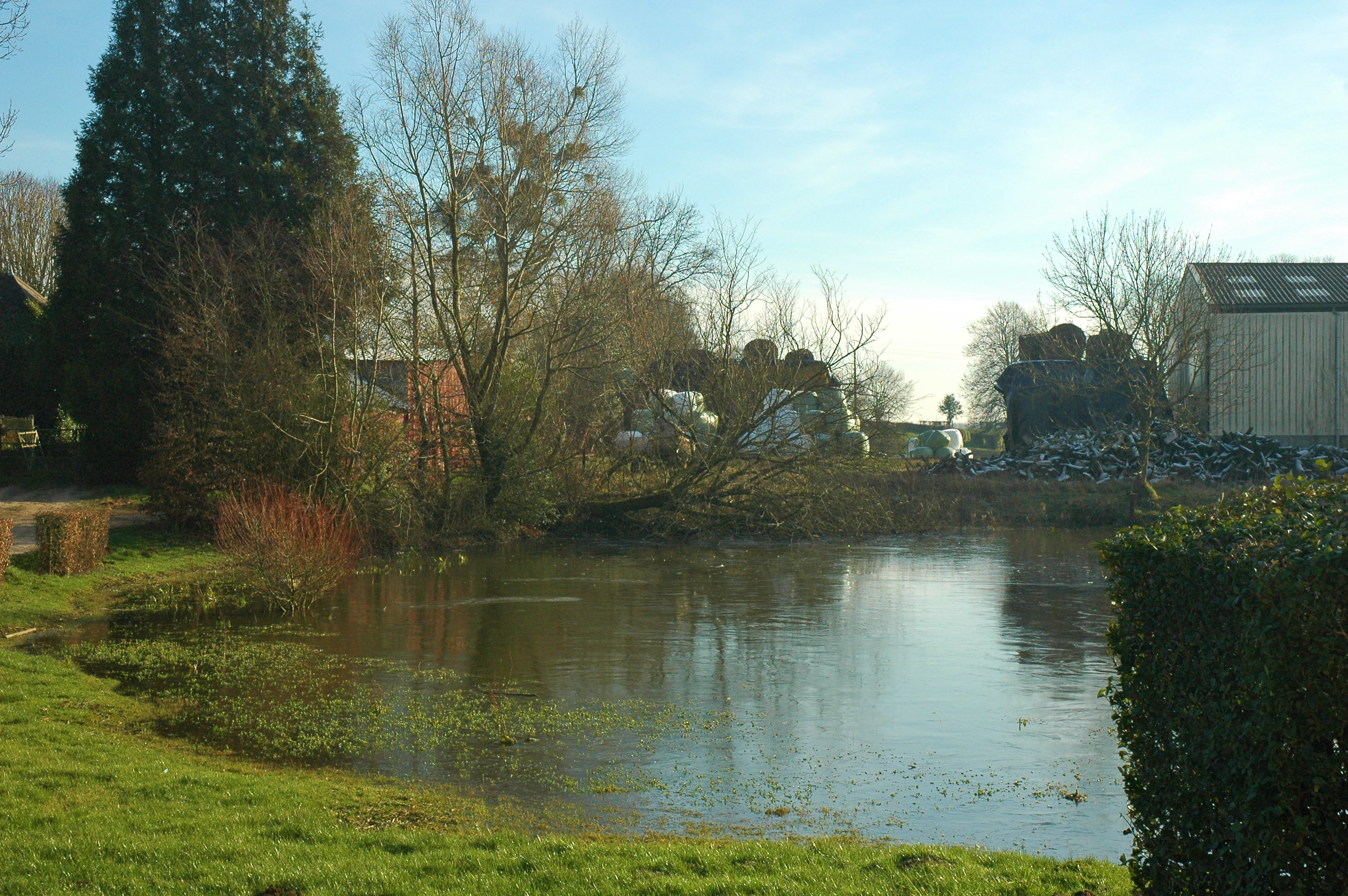
- The village pond in Saint-Pierre-des-Jonquières

- Coat of arms
- Location of Saint-Pierre-des-Jonquières
- Location within France Location within Normandy
- Coordinates: 49°51′08″N 1°27′11″E
- Country: France
- Region: Normandy
- Department: Seine-Maritime
- Arrondissement: Dieppe
- Canton: Neufchâtel-en-Bray
- Intercommunality: CC Londinières

Government
  - Mayor (2026–32): Bénédicte Biller
- Area^{1}: 8.31 km^{2} (3.21 sq mi)
- Elevation: 214 m (702 ft)
- Highest elevation: 212 m (696 ft)
- Lowest elevation: 108 m (354 ft)
- Population (2023): 74
  - Density: 8.9/km^{2} (23/sq mi)
- Time zone: UTC+01:00 (CET)
  - Summer (DST): UTC+02:00 (CEST)
- INSEE/Postal code: 76635 /76660
- ^{1} French Land Register data, which excludes lakes, ponds, glaciers > 1 km^{2} (0.386 sq mi or 247 acres) and river estuaries.

Saint-Pierre-des-Jonquières (French pronunciation: [sɛ̃ pjɛʁ de ʒɔ̃kjɛʁ]) is a commune in the Seine-Maritime department in the Normandy region in northern France.

== Geography ==
A farming village situated in the Pays de Bray, some 19 miles (31 km) southeast of Dieppe on the D59 roads,

== Population ==
Historical population
| Year | Pop. | ±% p.a. |
|---|---|---|
| 1968 | 187 | — |
| 1975 | 193 | +0.45% |
| 1982 | 163 | −2.38% |
| 1990 | 138 | −2.06% |
| 1999 | 126 | −1.01% |
| 2007 | 121 | −0.50% |
| 2012 | 95 | −4.72% |
| 2017 | 74 | −4.87% |
| 2023 | 74 | +0.00% |
Source: INSEE

== Places of interest ==
- The church of St. Pierre, dating from the seventeenth century.
- The chateau of Parfondeval, dating from the eighteenth century.

== See also ==
- Communes of the Seine-Maritime department
