= Eaulne =

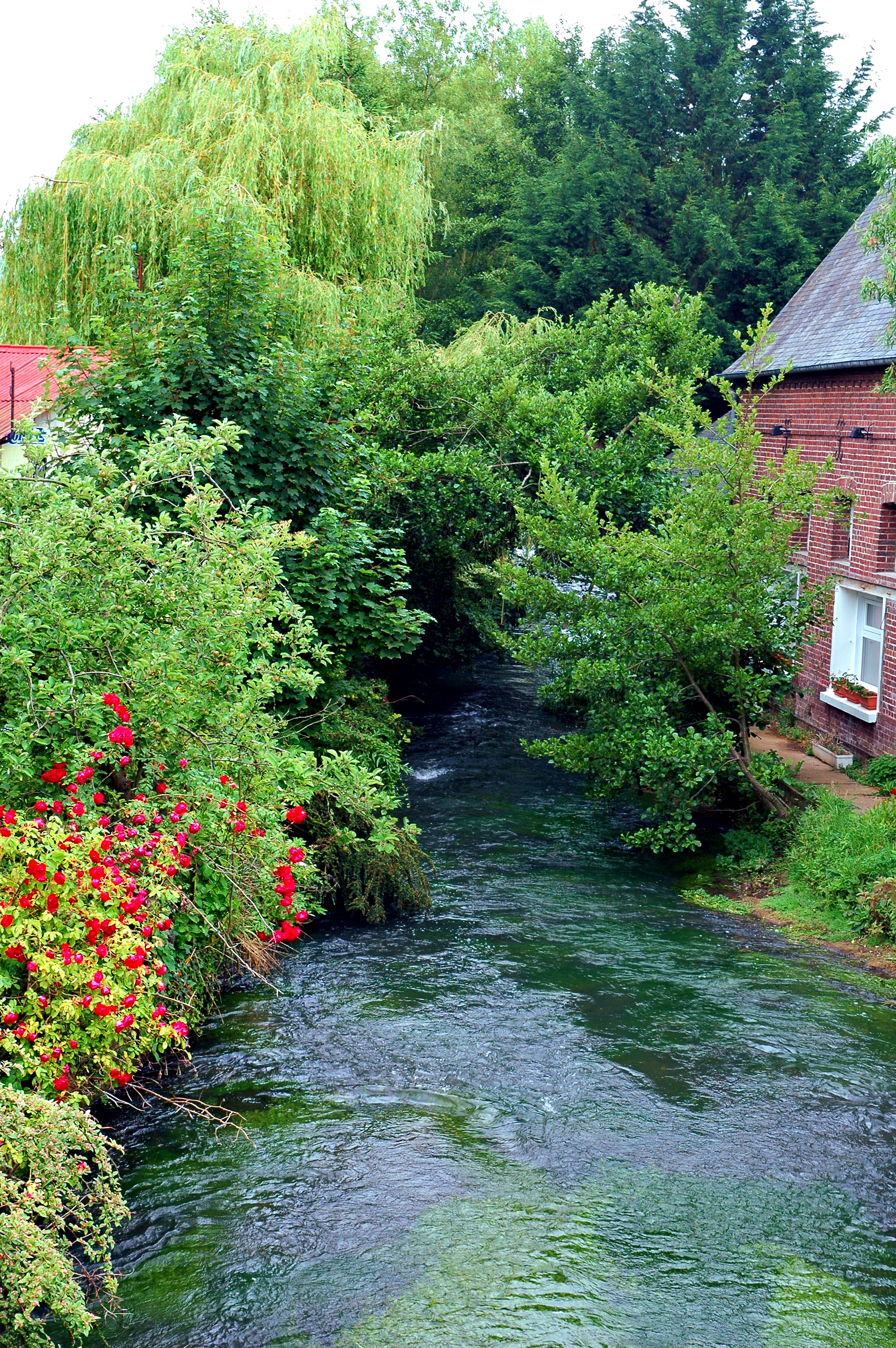
- The Eaulne at Ancourt

- Location within France Location within Normandy

Location
- Country: France

Physical characteristics
- Source
  - location: Pays de Caux
  - elevation: 140 m (460 ft)
- Mouth
  - location: Arques
  - coordinates: 49.8919°N 1.1302°E
- Length: 45.5 km (28.3 mi)
- Basin size: 318 km^{2} (123 sq mi)
- Discharge
  - average: 3.3 m^{3}/s (120 cu ft/s)

Basin features
- Progression: Arques→ English Channel

The river Eaulne (French pronunciation: [o(l)n]) is one of the rivers that flow from the plateau of the eastern Pays de Caux in the Seine-Maritime département of Normandy in northern France. It is 45.5 km (28.3 mi) long.

The Eaulne's source is at Mortemer. It then flows northwestwards through Sainte-Beuve-en-Rivière, Saint-Germain-sur-Eaulne, Londinières, Douvrend, Envermeu, turning westward at Bellengreville and on to Ancourt, Martin-Église and joins the river Arques at Arques-la-Bataille.

== See also ==
- French water management scheme
