= Canton of Bellencombre =

Coordinates: 49°42′30″N 1°12′59″E

Bellencombre
- Former canton
- Interactive map of Bellencombre
- Country: France
- Region: Normandy
- Department: Seine-Maritime
- No. of communes: {{{nbcomm}}}
- Disbanded: 2015
- Area: 145.21 km^{2} (56.07 sq mi)
- Population (2012): 7,641
  - Density: 52.62/km^{2} (136.3/sq mi)

The Canton of Bellencombre is a former canton situated in the Seine-Maritime département and in the Haute-Normandie region of northern France. It was disbanded following the French canton reorganisation which came into effect in March 2015. It had a total of 7,641 inhabitants (2012).

== Geography ==
A farming area in the arrondissement of Dieppe, centred on the town of Bellencombre. The altitude varies from 52m (Saint-Hellier) to 213m (Pommeréval) with an average altitude of 146m.

The canton comprised 15 communes:

- Ardouval
- Beaumont-le-Hareng
- Bellencombre
- Bosc-le-Hard
- Cottévrard
- Cressy
- La Crique
- Cropus
- Les Grandes-Ventes
- Grigneuseville
- Mesnil-Follemprise
- Pommeréval
- Rosay
- Saint-Hellier
- Sévis

== Population ==
Historical population Canton of Bellencombre
Year	1962	1968	1975	1982	1990	1999
Pop.	5,434	5,900	5,930	6,127	6,750	6,968
±%	—	+8.6%	+0.5%	+3.3%	+10.2%	+3.2%
From the year 1962 on: No double counting – residents of multiple communes (e.g. students and military personnel) are counted only once. Source: INSEE

== See also ==
- Arrondissements of the Seine-Maritime department
- Cantons of the Seine-Maritime department
- Communes of the Seine-Maritime department
