= Désiré-François Le Filleul Des Guerrots =

French poet and fabulist

Désiré-François Le Filleul des Guerrots (8 December 1778, Heugleville-sur-Scie – 3 June 1857, idem) was a 19th-century French poet and fabulist.

Born in an ancient and noble family of Normandy, Le Filleul des Guerrots was a member of the Académie de Rouen from 1810. For over thirty years, he was the poet laureate of the Académie, giving lectures of his fables, of reports, book reviews and translations of Horace, his classic favorite author.

== Works ==
- Le Papillon, Rouen, P. Périaux, 1813;
- Fables et poésies diverses, Paris, de Fain, 1818; rééd. 1821, Paris, F. Didot, 1824, Paris, Pihan-Delaforest, 1836, Rouen, A. Péron, 1843, 1852;
- Fables, Rouen, A. Péron, 1843;
- Les Fleurs de la Fête-Dieu ou l’Effet des richesses, idylle, Rouen, A. Péron, 1845.

== Sources ==
- Théodore-Éloi Lebreton, Biographie rouennaise, Rouen, Le Brument, 1865, (p. 460).
- Noémi-Noire Oursel, Nouvelle Biographie normande on Gallica, vol 2., Rouen, A. Picard, 1886, (p. 101).
