= Réseau AGIR =

Network for ACTION
- Réseau AGIR
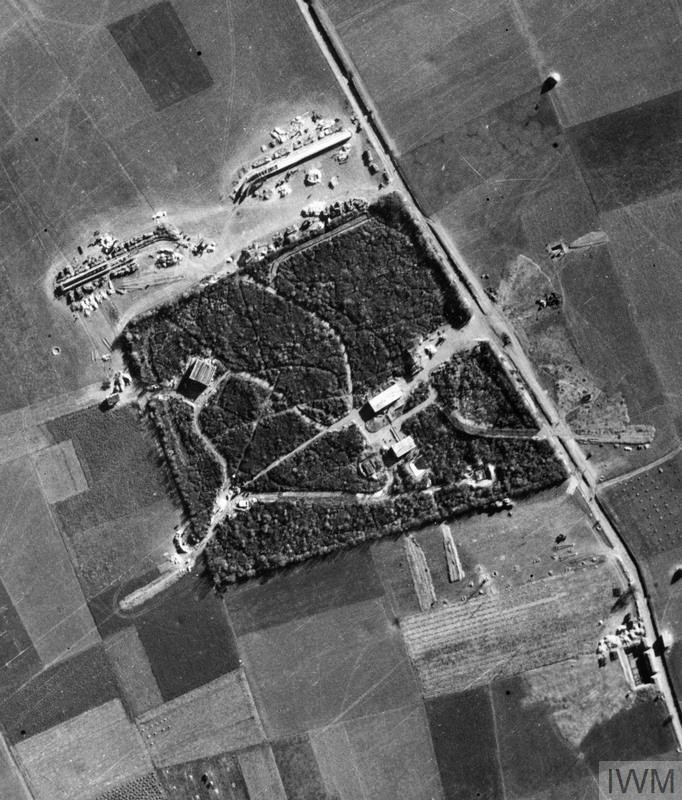
- Vertical photographic-reconnaissance aerial of a flying-bomb launch site under construction at Bois Carre, near Yvrench, discovered and documented by the agents of the Réseau AGIR
- Active: 1941
- Country: Occupied France
- Allegiance: Allies of World War II
- Type: French Resistance
- Role: Human intelligence (espionage)
- Size: up to 200 informants

The Réseau AGIR (English: Network for ACTION) was a World War II espionage group founded by French wartime resister Michel Hollard that provided decisive human intelligence on V-1 flying bomb facilities in the North of France. Thanks to Hollard's reports and information from his agents of the Réseau AGIR, the V1 launch sites located across North-Eastern Normandy to the Strait of Dover, were systematically bombed during Operation Crossbow.

== Creation and organisation ==
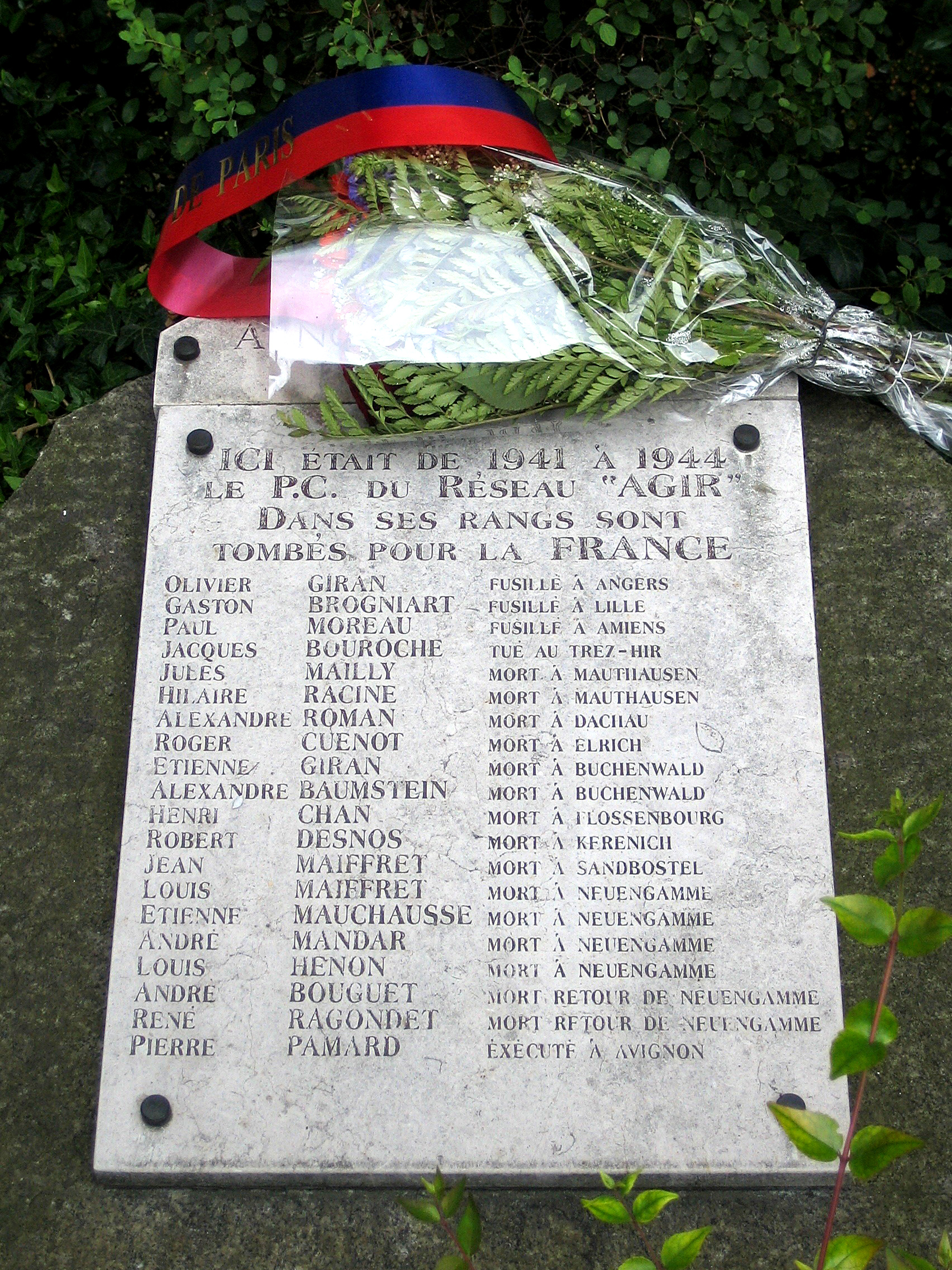
Plaque commemorating the 20 people who were killed in action for the Réseau AGIR during World War II. It is located in Paris, at the rue de Bercy 207, where was situated the former Hotel d'Annecy where the command post of the Réseau AGIR.

The Réseau AGIR was created by Michel Hollard in 1941. The espionage network had no contact with other French resistance groups and reported directly to the British Secret Intelligence Service (S.I.S.).

During the war, the network was codenamed "Z 165" after the codename given to Hollard himself by the Intelligence Service. AGIR or Réseau AGIR only emerged after Hollard's return from the Liberation of France.

Early 1941, Hollard became the concessionaire for the Seine department for the "Maison Gazogène Autobloc", headquartered in Dijon, that, among other things, produced wood gas generators for automobiles and supplied its clients with charcoal. Hollard was allowed to travel in search of wood nationwide and purchase wood to turn it into charcoal to preserve the increasingly scarce fuel in occupied France.

In 1941, Hollard traveled to the French Free Zone and crossed the Swiss border for the first time to offer his services as a spy to the British embassy in Bern. He was greeted icily despite intelligence about France's wartime automotive manufacturing capabilities that he had brought with him to show his goodwill. When he came back a month later, the second meeting was much warmer since the British military attaché had made the necessary checks about him. Hollard was tasked to report the position and description of the German forces in the French Occupied Zone, especially the armored divisions. He committed to delivering intelligence every three weeks.

His job enabled him to travel around France using his job as a cover. Mostly traveling by train, he primarily established contacts with railway employees who, due to their work, had knowledge of the occupying forces' activities or knew how to obtain it.

From the very beginning, Hollard insisted that all actions should be organized through personal contacts only and that the exchange of researched material should only be forwarded or handed over to him personally. He distrusted the means of communication, such as the telephone or even radio, and saw in it a source of vulnerability for the network for the enemy. AGIR used signals with basic code like e.g. an open barn door indicated a Swiss border clear of soldiers. Entirely self-sufficient, the network did not rely on parachute drops or wireless transmitters. Intelligence was collected and sent to Switzerland every 3 weeks.

Hollard paid for the AGIR expenses, out of his pocket, until the British intelligence recognized the importance of the information collected by the network and offered to finance it. The network could rely on safe houses to cross the Swiss border and a safe place near Compiègnes disguised as a peat-based fuel factory next to a bog in the marshes of the river Oise.

Early 1942, Hollard had recruited a total of 6 agents, distributed throughout the Occupied Zone, to report the movement of German forces as requested by the British. All of them were personally financed by Hollard. The network could also rely on volunteers to gather information on German facilities like aerodromes and factories. Railway employees and station masters also played an important to report changes in enemy positions. When the Zone libre was placed under German military administration in November 1942, the network needed to grow to gather information in the whole of France. Hollard recruited hotel personnel and domestic workers working in requisitioned hotels or private houses to cater to German troops.

On 30 juin 1942, Réseau AGIR member Olivier Giran was captured in Dijon, later transferred to the Fresnes prison and executed in April 1943 in Angers.

Hollard smuggled information from Occupied France first to the British military attaché in Bern, Switzerland and later, to his handler of the Intelligence Service in Lausanne . He made a total of ninety-eight crossings of the Swiss border from 1941 through February 1944 when he was betrayed and arrested on 5 February 1944. Michel Hollard and 4 other AGIR agents (including Henri Dujarier and Jules Mailly) were arrested during a cafe meeting on the Rue du Faubourg-Saint-Denis. Hollard was tortured and subjected to waterboarding five times by the Gestapo and the Milice, and imprisoned first at Fresnes prison and in June 1944 as a forced laborer at the main Neuengamme concentration camp. Jules Mailly died in Mauthausen concentration camp.

The network was composed of about two hundred agents and informants at its peak, among which French poet Robert Desnos. Arrested by the Gestapo on 22 February 1944, Desnos provided information collected during his job at the journal Aujourd'hui and made false identity papers.

In total, 20 agents and informants of Réseaux AGIR were arrested, 4 executed and 17 died in or as a result of deportation.

== V-1 espionage ==
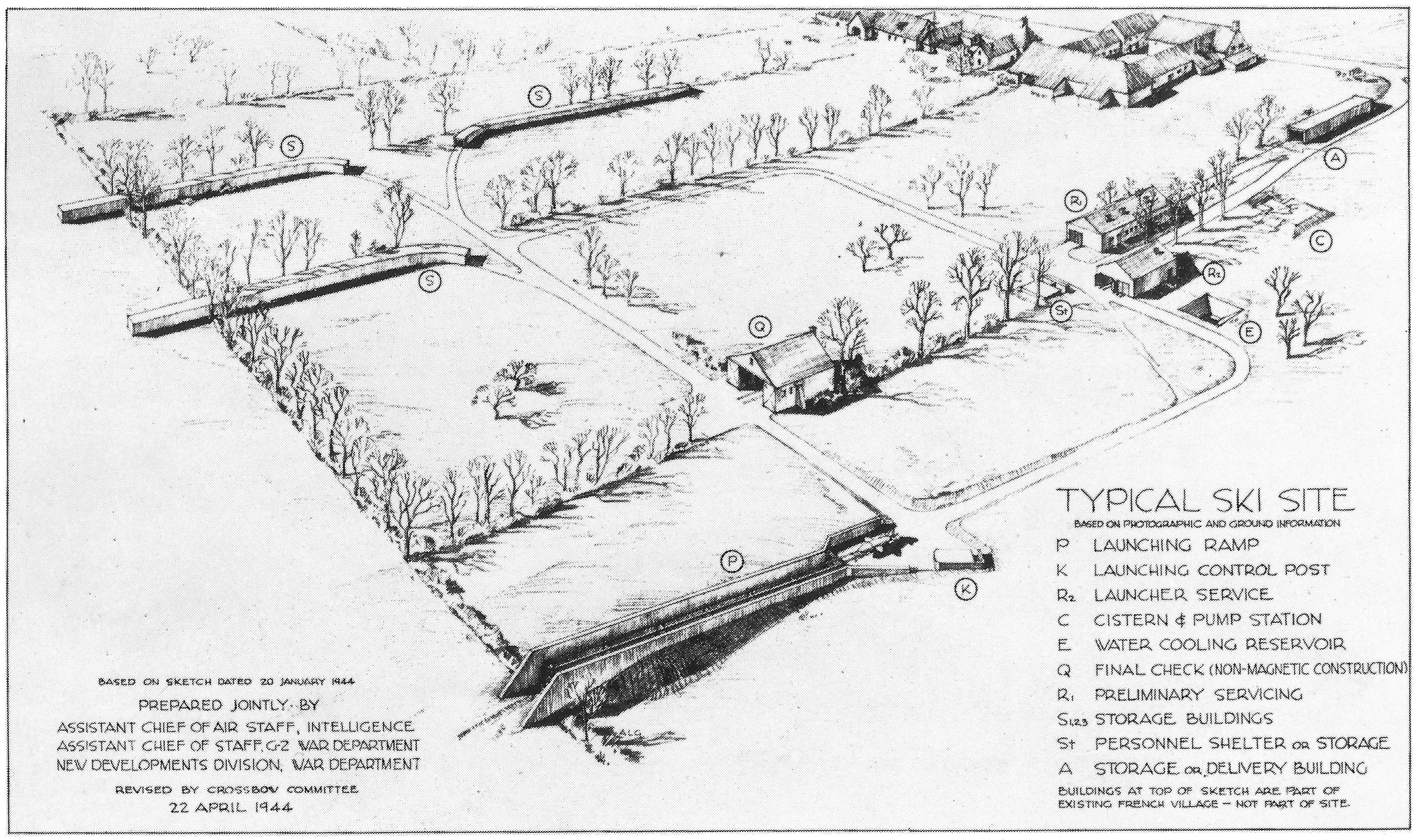
AGIR provided HUMINT on V-1 flying bomb "ski sites", e.g., some had launch ramps ("P", bottom), here Maisoncelle.

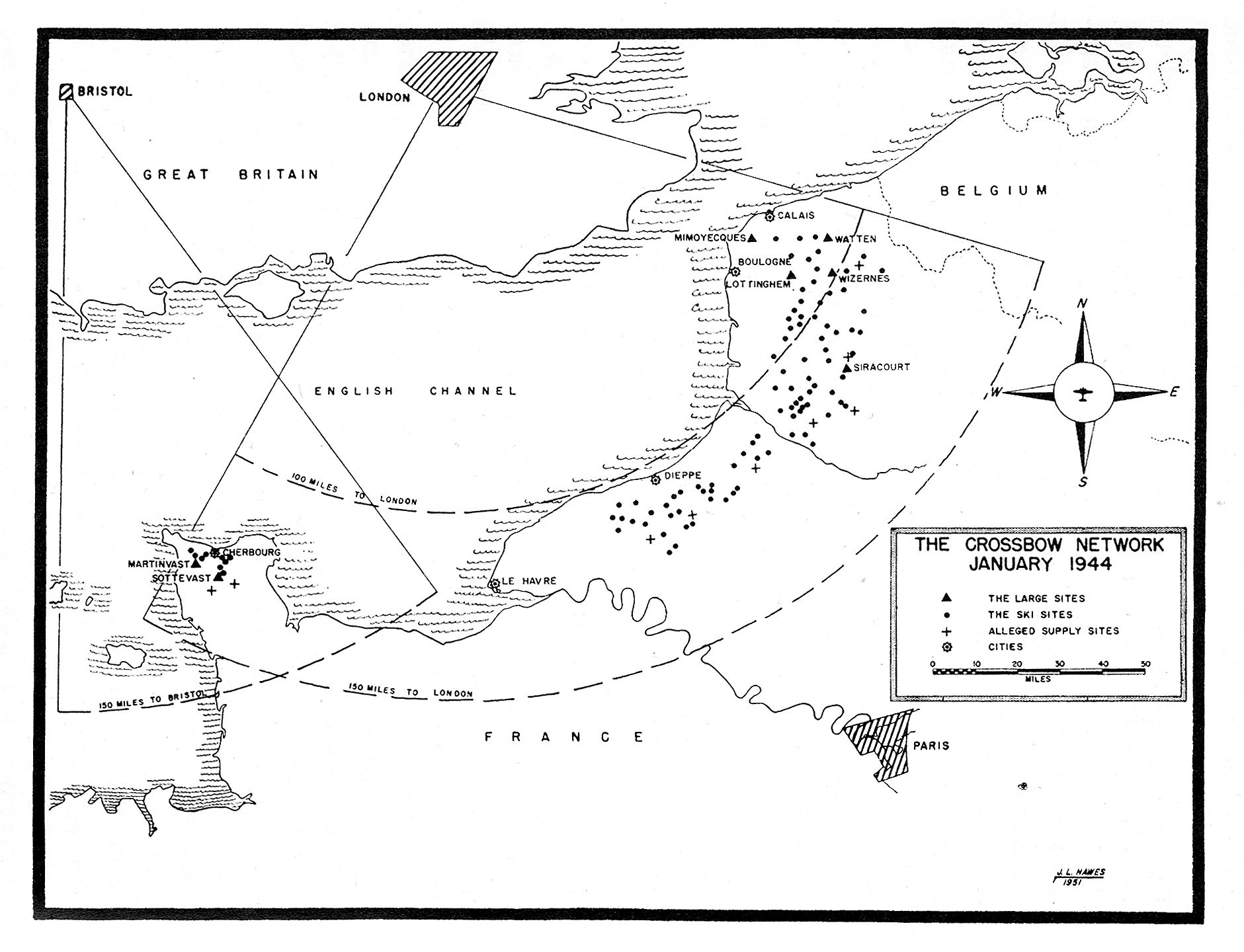
World War II map showing the two areas where the Germans were setting up their secret V-1, V-2 and V-3 weapons to bombard London. This sites were systematically bombed during the Operation Crossbow.

Daudemard, an AGIR railway engineer at Rouen reported in July 1943 unusual constructions in Upper Normandy. Michel Hollard's report of September 1943 to the British Secret Intelligence Service identified six V-1 flying bomb facilities: "Bonnetot le Faubourg [sic], Auffay [sic], Totes, Ribeaucourt, Maison Ponthieu and Bois Carré".

AGIR prepared a more detailed report in October about Bois Carré, which is located 1.4 km east of Yvrench, that claimed it had "a concrete platform with the center axis pointing directly to London". AGIR reconnoitered 104 V-1 facilities and helped pinpointing the Watten bunker, the first V-2 launching site.

AGIR also provided sketches of V-1 launching sites such as one by André Comps of Bois-Carré. It was labeled "Yvrench B^{2}" to deceive the Germans. "B" stands for "Bois" in French and "2" stands for the square root which in French is "Carré", hence Bois-Carré. Hollard had the site infiltrated by Comps, who worked as a drafter and copied "the blueprints"— a copy of the compass swinging building blueprint and the Bois-Carré sketch were published in 1978.

At the same time, André Bouguet, SNCF station director and AGIR informant, noticed transports that led north via Rouen. The destination of these transports was the Auffay train station. With the help of René Bourdon, the station manager there, and his assistant Pierre Carteron, Hollard was able to penetrate a shed of the local sugar factory in which the transported V-1 were stored, hidden under a tarpaulin and made precise dimensional sketches of the devices. The S.I.S. found an astonishing resemblance to Danish Lt-Colonel Hasager Christiansen's sketch that he had made of an aircraft that crashed on Bornholm on 22 August 1943.

Thanks to Hollard's reports and information from his agents of the Réseau AGIR, the V1 launch sites located in the North of France, across North-Eastern Normandy to the Strait of Dover, were systematically bombed by the Royal Air Force between mid-December 1943 and March-end 1944, as a part of the Operation Crossbow. Nine V1 sites were destroyed, 35 badly damaged and partially damaged another 25 out of the 104. As a result, the Germans changed their strategy and started building lighter and more camouflaged positions.

In his book Crusade in Europe General Eisenhower wrote that had the Germans been able to develop their weapons six months earlier and to target Britain's south coast, Operation Overlord would have been near impossible, or not at all possible. Winston Churchill, in Triumph and Tragedy also paid tribute to the sources of the British intelligence and reckoned that "Our intelligence had played a vital part. The size and performance and the intended scale of attack were known to us in excellent time [...] The launching sites and the storage caverns were found, enabling our fighters to delay the attack and mitigate its violence."

== Post-war ==
AGIR agents received various British and French military awards (including Hollard's DSO for V-1 espionage, second Croix de Guerre and Légion d'honneur), and Hollard's biographies provide AGIR history. Decorated with the Légion d'honneur, the French Croix de Guerre and the British King's Medal for Courage, Joseph Brocard was the last surviving AGIR agent and died in 2009.

The flag of the AGIR network is on display at the Imperial War Museum, London.

== Bibliography ==
Primary sources

- Granet, Marie (21 February 1950). "Témoignage de Michel Hollard, recueilli par Marie Granet" [Testimony of Michel Hollard, collected by Marie Granet]. France – Archives Nationales (in French).
- Guignepain, M. (14 October 1949). "Témoignage de Charles Guillard, recueilli par M. Guignepain" [Testimony of Charles Guillard, collected by Mr. Guignepain]. France – Archives Nationales (in French).
- Hollard, Michel (1950). "Extraits de différents numéros du bulletin rédigé par Michel Hollard pour retracer les activités du réseau AGIR, communiqués à Marie Granet" [Excerpts from various issues of the bulletin written by Michel Hollard to recount the activities of the AGIR network, communicated to Marie Granet]. France – Archives Nationales (in French).
- Michel, Henri (14 October 1949). "Témoignage de M. Daudemard, recueilli par Henri Michel" [Testimony of M. Daudemard, collected by Henri Michel]. France – Archives Nationales (in French).

Secondary sources

- "The V-Weapons". After the Battle: 3, 14, 16. 1974. Archived from the original on 2007-12-26.
- Bauer, Eddy (1972) [1966]. Illustrated World War II Encyclopedia. Vol. 15. H. S. Stuttman Inc. ISBN 0-87475-520-4.
- Breuer, William B. (1988). The Secret War with Germany: Deception, Espionage, and Dirty Tricks, 1939–1945. Presidio Press. ISBN 978-0-89141-298-4.
- Desquesnes, Rémy (2003). 1940-1944, l'histoire secrète du Mur de l'Atlantique: de l'Organisation Todt au débarquement en Normandie (in French). Editions des Falaises. ISBN 978-2-84811-009-7.
- Jones, R. V. (1978). Most Secret War: British Scientific Intelligence 1939–1945. London: Hamish Hamilton. pp. 300, 362–3. ISBN 0-241-89746-7. "at Bonnetot le Faubourg [Comps] succeeded in copying the plans of every building at the Bois Carré site"
- Gurney, Gene (Major, USAF) (1962). The War in the Air: a pictorial history of World War II Air Forces in combat. New York: Bonanza Books. p. 184. "The launching ramp (P) had a double track enclosed in concrete walls."
- Jeffery, Keith (2010). MI6 : the history of the Secret Intelligence Service 1909–1949. London : New York: Bloomsbury. ISBN 978-0-7475-9183-2.
- Lee, Bruce (2001). Marching orders: the untold story of World War II. ISBN 978-0-306-81036-7.
- Lyman, Robert (31 July 2014). The Jail Busters: The Secret Story of MI6, the French Resistance and Operation Jericho. Quercus. ISBN 978-1-78206-538-8.
- Martelli, George (1960). Agent extraordinary: the story of Michel Hollard, D. S. O., Croix de guerre (in French). Collins. OCLC 1349946.
- Mindling, George; Bolton, Robert (2008). U.S. Air Force Tactical Missiles. Lulu.com. ISBN 978-0-557-00029-6.
- Richardot, Jean-Pierre (2002). Une autre Suisse 1940–1944 (in French). Félin. ISBN 978-2-8309-1021-6.
- Young, Richard Anthony (1978). The Flying Bomb. Sky Books Press.
- Williams, Allan (30 May 2013). Operation Crossbow: The Untold Story of the Search for Hitler's Secret Weapons. Random House. ISBN 978-1-4090-5173-2.
- Churchill, Winston (11 May 2014). Triumph and Tragedy, 1953. RosettaBooks. ISBN 978-0-7953-1147-5.
