= Val-de-Scie =

- Commune
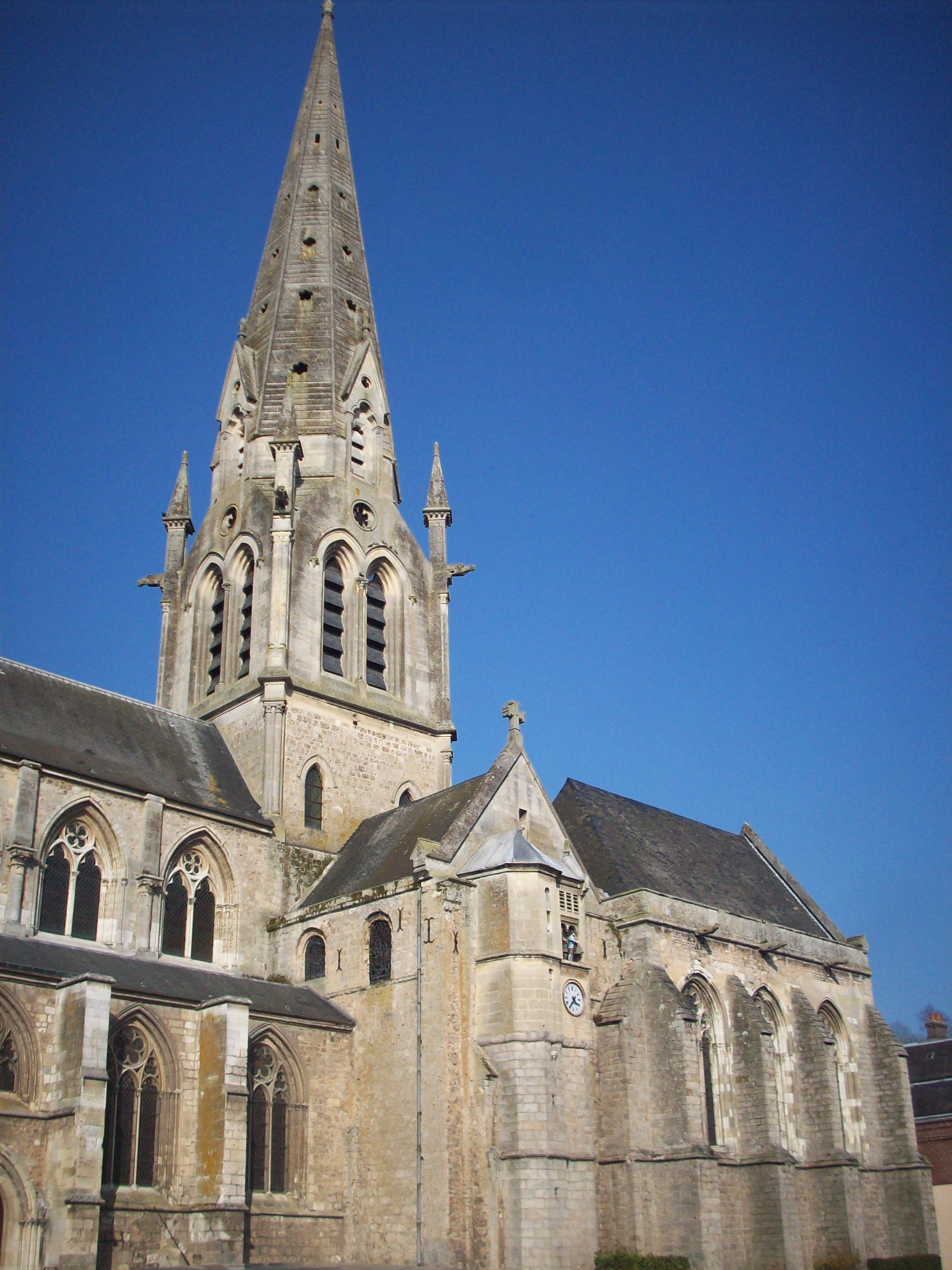
- The church in Auffay
- Location of Val-de-Scie
- Location within France Location within Normandy
- Coordinates: 49°43′07″N 1°06′04″E
- Country: France
- Region: Normandy
- Department: Seine-Maritime
- Arrondissement: Dieppe
- Canton: Luneray
- Intercommunality: CC Terroir de Caux

Government
  - Mayor (2026–32): Christian Suronne
- Area^{1}: 22.05 km^{2} (8.51 sq mi)
- Highest elevation: 172 m (564 ft)
- Lowest elevation: 66 m (217 ft)
- Population (2023): 2,530
  - Density: 115/km^{2} (297/sq mi)
- Time zone: UTC+01:00 (CET)
  - Summer (DST): UTC+02:00 (CEST)
- INSEE/Postal code: 76034 /76720
- ^{1} French Land Register data, which excludes lakes, ponds, glaciers > 1 km^{2} (0.386 sq mi or 247 acres) and river estuaries.

Val-de-Scie (French pronunciation: [val də si], literally Vale of Scie) is a commune in the Seine-Maritime department in the Normandy region in northern France. It was established on 1 January 2019 by merger of the former communes of Auffay (the seat), Cressy and Sévis.

== Population ==
Population data refer to the area corresponding with the commune as of January 2025.

Historical population
Year	Pop.	±% p.a.
1968	1,947	—
1975	2,141	+1.37%
1982	2,231	+0.59%
1990	2,396	+0.90%
1999	2,377	−0.09%
2007	2,321	−0.30%
2012	2,539	+1.81%
2017	2,555	+0.13%
2023	2,530	−0.16%
Source: INSEE

== See also ==
- Communes of the Seine-Maritime department
