= Michel Hollard =

French engineer and member of the French Resistance

- World War II portrait
- Born: 10 July 1898; Épinay-sur-Seine, Seine, France
- Died: 16 July 1993 (aged 95); Ganges, Hérault, France
- Resting place: Gorniès, Hérault, France; 43°53′29.13″N 3°37′32.78″E
- Education: Engineer
- Occupation: French Resistance member
- Organization(s): Réseau AGIR, French Resistance
- Known for: Investigation of the V-1 flying bomb facilities in Northern France during World War II
- Spouse: Yvonne Gounelle
- Children: Francine, Florian (former conductor of the Orchestre symphonique de la région Centre) and Vincent
- Parent(s): Auguste Hollard; Pauline Monod
- Website: www.michel-hollard.fr

Michel Hollard (10 July 1898 – 16 July 1993) was a French engineer and member of the French Resistance who founded the espionage group Réseau AGIR during the Second World War.

His contribution was recognised by the British by the award of the Distinguished Service Order for having "reconnoitered a number of heavily guarded V-1 sites and reported on them". Hollard's efforts included 49 trips smuggling reports to a British attaché in Switzerland by foot across the border in all weather.

Sir Brian Horrocks called him "the man who literally saved London". Thanks to Hollard's reports and information from his agents, the V1 launch sites in France were systematically bombed by the Royal Air Force between mid-December 1943 and March-end 1944. V-1s caused the destruction of over 80,000 homes in Britain between June and September 1944, but British air raids destroyed nine V1 sites, badly damaged 35 and partially damaged another 25 out of the 104 located in the North of France across North-Eastern Normandy to the Strait of Dover. In his book Crusade in Europe General Eisenhower wrote that had the Germans been able to develop their weapons six months earlier and to target Britain's south coast, Operation Overlord would have been near impossible, or not at all possible.

== Life ==
Initially serving in World War I, Hollard subsequently became an engineer. Working for an armament firm, he fled Paris after the French capitulation in 1940 to rally his firm's HQ in the Free Zone in the south of France and was nearly set upon twice on his way by frantic French crowds, who thought he was a German paratrooper. He later resigned from his post when his company began working for the occupation authorities and gained employment with a manufacturer of wood gas generators, which enabled him to travel around France using his job as a cover. In 1941 Hollard crossed the defenses barring access to the French Free Zone and the Swiss border for the first time to offer his services as a spy to the British embassy in Bern. He was greeted icily despite recommendations and intelligence about France's wartime automotive manufacturing capabilities that he had brought with him to show his goodwill. When he came back, the second meeting was much warmer since the British had made the necessary checks about him. He founded the Réseau AGIR resistance network in 1941, working directly for the Secret Intelligence Service. Hollard and his agents began to supply regular information of the highest quality, leading Hollard to be considered one of the most reliable sources working for the British.

On 5 February 1944, he was captured with three of his agents in a café near Gare du Nord in Paris after having been betrayed. Taken prisoner by the Nazis, he was tortured and subjected to waterboarding five times, and imprisoned first at Fresnes Prison and in June 1944 as a forced laborer at the main Neuengamme concentration camp (prisoner "F 33,948").

He was then placed with hundreds of other men in dreadful conditions, without food, salubrity or medical attention, on board the prison ship Thielbek that was part of a flotilla of German prison boats in the Bay of Lübeck alongside the SS Cap Arcona. All prisoners were in fact going to be executed under direct orders from Himmler. Count Folke Bernadotte, who was vice-president of the Swedish Red Cross, had been informed by the British Intelligence Service that Hollard was there, but was unable to locate him, so pleaded that "all French-speaking prisoners be transferred to another ship", the Magdalena. This happened on 20 April; on 3 May the Thielbek was sunk by a Royal Air Force attack on the German flotilla. Of the 2,800 prisoners on board, only 50 survived the attack.

After the war, Hollard "was given the rank of Colonel".

A high-speed train that operates Eurostar's high-speed rail service between Britain, France and Belgium via the Channel Tunnel was named after him.

A Huguenot descendant, one of his ancestors was the pastor, Jacques Monod. His father was the nuclear physicist, chemist and historian, Auguste Hollard. He is a cousin of the scientist and explorer, Théodore Monod and of the Nobel Prize winner, Jacques Monod.

== Honours and awards ==
- Commandeur de l'ordre de la Légion d'Honneur
- Croix de guerre, 1914–1918
- Croix de guerre, 1939–1945
- Médaille de la Résistance
- Distinguished Service Order
