= Manéhouville =

- Commune
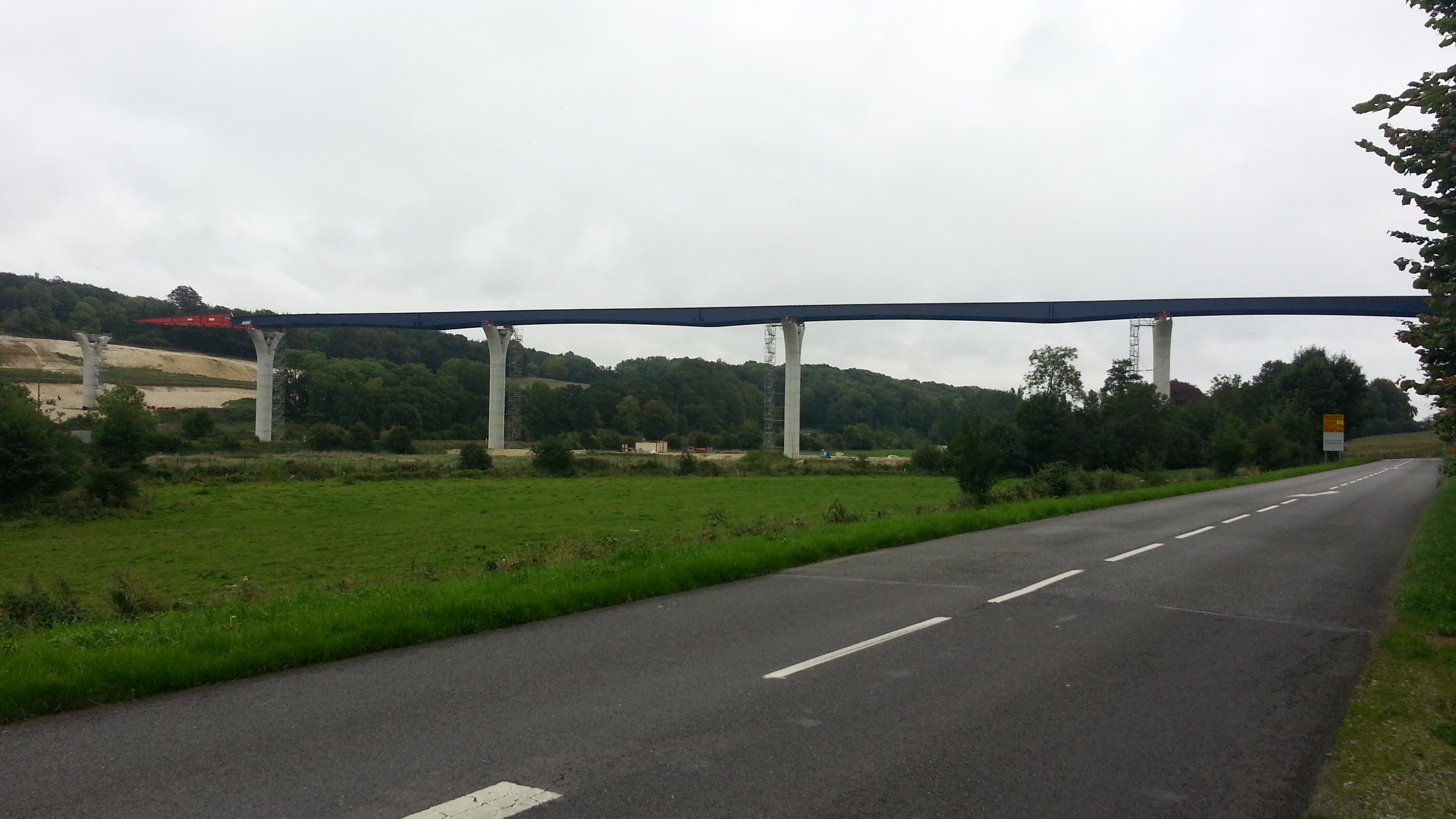
- La Scie viaduct looking from Sauqueville

- Coat of arms
- Location of Manéhouville
- Location within France Location within Normandy
- Coordinates: 49°50′09″N 1°04′53″E
- Country: France
- Region: Normandy
- Department: Seine-Maritime
- Arrondissement: Dieppe
- Canton: Luneray
- Intercommunality: CC Terroir de Caux

Government
  - Mayor (2026–32): Sébastien Duramé
- Area^{1}: 4.28 km^{2} (1.65 sq mi)
- Elevation: 38 m (125 ft)
- Highest elevation: 107 m (351 ft)
- Lowest elevation: 29 m (95 ft)
- Population (2023): 211
  - Density: 49.3/km^{2} (128/sq mi)
- Time zone: UTC+01:00 (CET)
  - Summer (DST): UTC+02:00 (CEST)
- INSEE/Postal code: 76405 /76590
- ^{1} French Land Register data, which excludes lakes, ponds, glaciers > 1 km^{2} (0.386 sq mi or 247 acres) and river estuaries.

Manéhouville (French pronunciation: [maneuvil]) is a commune in the Seine-Maritime department in the Normandy region in northern France.

== Geography ==
A small farming village situated by the banks of the river Scie in the Pays de Caux, some 6 miles (9.7 km) south of Dieppe at the junction of the D927, the D23 and the D3 roads.

== Population ==
Historical population
Year	Pop.	±% p.a.
1968	141	—
1975	171	+2.79%
1982	206	+2.70%
1990	218	+0.71%
1999	183	−1.93%
2007	205	+1.43%
2012	215	+0.96%
2017	226	+1.00%
2023	211	−1.14%
Source: INSEE

== Places of interest ==
- The church of Notre-Dame, dating from the sixteenth century.
- Vestiges of the 17th-century château de Charles-Mesnil.

== See also ==
- Communes of the Seine-Maritime department
