= Heugleville-sur-Scie =

- Commune
- Location of Heugleville-sur-Scie
- Location within France Location within Normandy
- Coordinates: 49°43′53″N 1°05′59″E
- Country: France
- Region: Normandy
- Department: Seine-Maritime
- Arrondissement: Dieppe
- Canton: Luneray
- Intercommunality: CC Terroir de Caux

Government
  - Mayor (2026–32): Laurette Troche
- Area^{1}: 13.09 km^{2} (5.05 sq mi)
- Elevation: 86 m (282 ft)
- Highest elevation: 157 m (515 ft)
- Lowest elevation: 77 m (253 ft)
- Population (2023): 636
  - Density: 48.6/km^{2} (126/sq mi)
- Time zone: UTC+01:00 (CET)
  - Summer (DST): UTC+02:00 (CEST)
- INSEE/Postal code: 76360 /76720
- ^{1} French Land Register data, which excludes lakes, ponds, glaciers > 1 km^{2} (0.386 sq mi or 247 acres) and river estuaries.

Heugleville-sur-Scie (French pronunciation: [œɡləvil syʁ si], literally Heugleville on Scie) is a commune in the Seine-Maritime department in the Normandy region in northern France. The poet and fabulist Désiré-François Le Filleul Des Guerrots (1778–1857) was born in the village.

== Geography ==
A forestry and farming village situated by the banks of the river Scie in the Pays de Caux, some 12 miles (19 km) south of Dieppe at the junction of the D3, the D96 and the D296 roads.

== Population ==
Historical population
| Year | Pop. | ±% p.a. |
|---|---|---|
| 1968 | 603 | — |
| 1975 | 539 | −1.59% |
| 1982 | 527 | −0.32% |
| 1990 | 509 | −0.43% |
| 1999 | 544 | +0.74% |
| 2007 | 542 | −0.05% |
| 2012 | 606 | +2.26% |
| 2017 | 637 | +1.00% |
| 2023 | 636 | −0.03% |
Source: INSEE

== Places of interest ==
- The two chateau of Guerrots and Montpinçon, both dating from the nineteenth century.
- The church of St. Aubin, dating from the sixteenth century.
- A seventeenth century manorhouse.
- The ruins of a feudal castle.

== See also ==
- Communes of the Seine-Maritime department
