= Anneville-sur-Scie =

- Commune
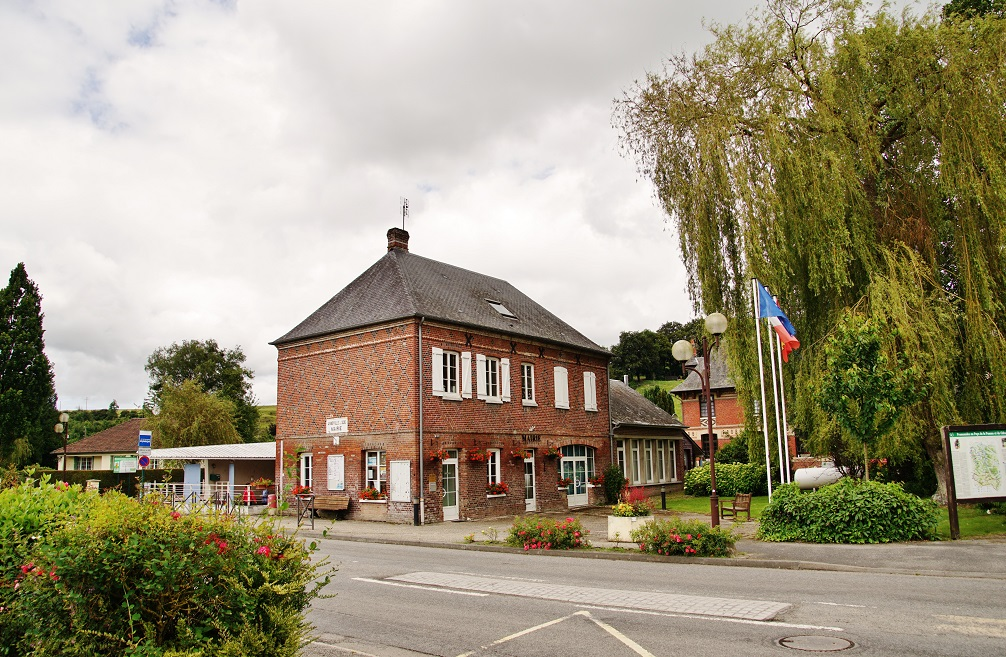
- The town hall in Anneville-sur-Scie

- Coat of arms
- Location of Anneville-sur-Scie
- Location within France Location within Normandy
- Coordinates: 49°49′54″N 1°05′15″E
- Country: France
- Region: Normandy
- Department: Seine-Maritime
- Arrondissement: Dieppe
- Canton: Luneray
- Intercommunality: CC Terroir de Caux

Government
  - Mayor (2026–32): Sébastien Brunneval
- Area^{1}: 5.41 km^{2} (2.09 sq mi)
- Elevation: 38 m (125 ft)
- Highest elevation: 118 m (387 ft)
- Lowest elevation: 26 m (85 ft)
- Population (2023): 405
  - Density: 74.9/km^{2} (194/sq mi)
- Time zone: UTC+01:00 (CET)
  - Summer (DST): UTC+02:00 (CEST)
- INSEE/Postal code: 76019 /76590
- ^{1} French Land Register data, which excludes lakes, ponds, glaciers > 1 km^{2} (0.386 sq mi or 247 acres) and river estuaries.

Anneville-sur-Scie (French pronunciation: [anvil syʁ si], literally Anneville on Scie, before 1962: Anneville) is a commune in the Seine-Maritime department in the Normandy region in northern France.

== Geography ==
A village of farming and associated light industry, situated in the river Scie valley of the Pays de Caux, some 6 miles (9.7 km) south of Dieppe, at the junction of the D23 and D3 roads.

== Population ==
Historical population
Year	Pop.	±% p.a.
1968	365	—
1975	358	−0.28%
1982	386	+1.08%
1990	433	+1.45%
1999	408	−0.66%
2007	445	+1.09%
2012	450	+0.22%
2017	432	−0.81%
2023	405	−1.07%
Source: INSEE

== Places of interest ==
- The church of St. Valery, dating from the sixteenth century.
- The château d'Ecorcheboeuf, dating from the eighteenth century
- The ruins of a 14th-century fortified house.
- An eighteenth-century chapel.

== See also ==
- Communes of the Seine-Maritime department
