= Longueville-sur-Scie =

- Commune
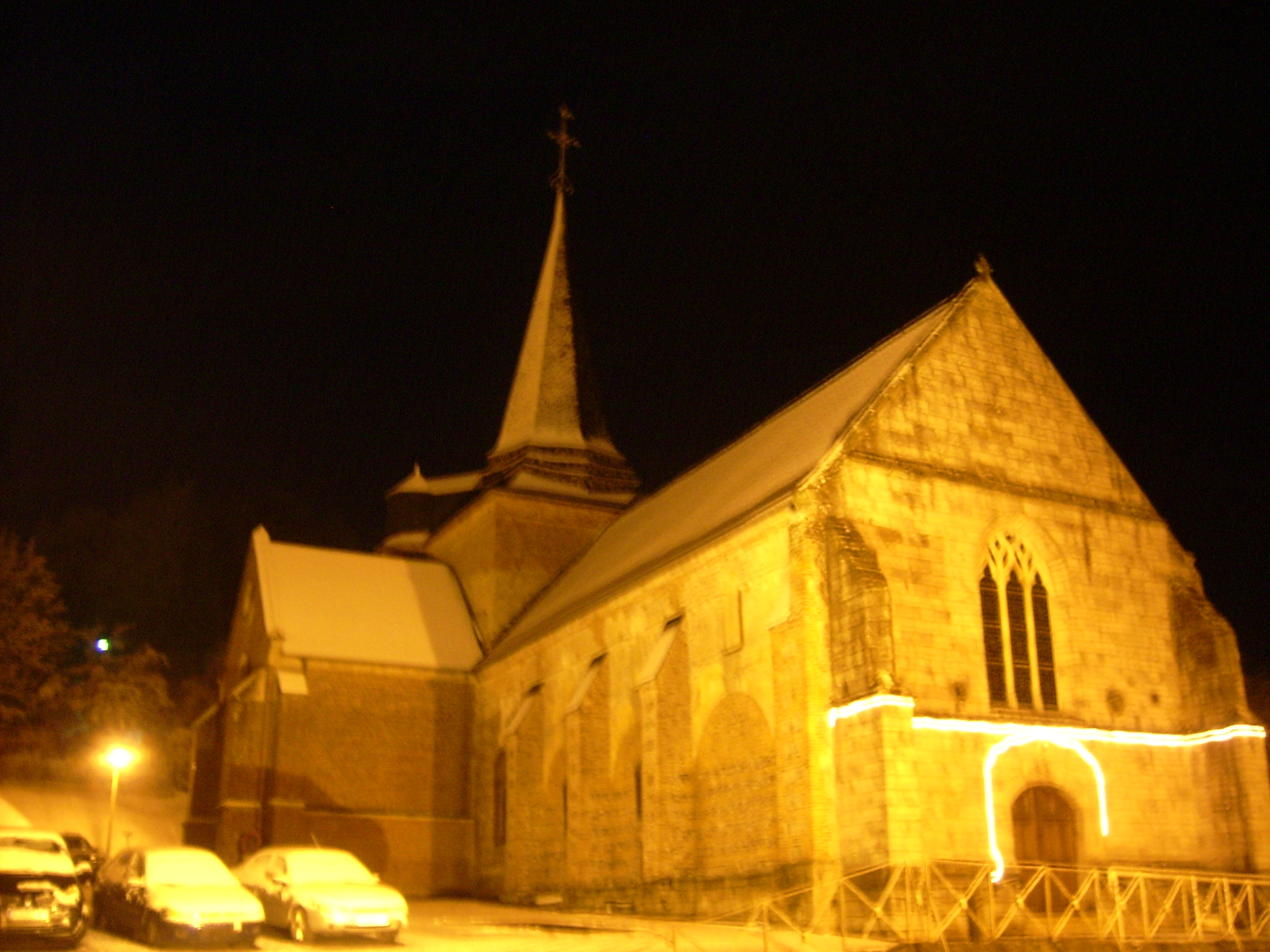
- The church in Longueville-sur-Scie

- Coat of arms
- Location of Longueville-sur-Scie
- Location within France Location within Normandy
- Coordinates: 49°47′34″N 1°06′37″E
- Country: France
- Region: Normandy
- Department: Seine-Maritime
- Arrondissement: Dieppe
- Canton: Luneray
- Intercommunality: CC Terroir de Caux

Government
  - Mayor (2026–32): Olivier Bureaux
- Area^{1}: 3.96 km^{2} (1.53 sq mi)
- Elevation: 95 m (312 ft)
- Highest elevation: 139 m (456 ft)
- Lowest elevation: 52 m (171 ft)
- Population (2023): 900
  - Density: 230/km^{2} (590/sq mi)
- Time zone: UTC+01:00 (CET)
  - Summer (DST): UTC+02:00 (CEST)
- INSEE/Postal code: 76397 /76590
- ^{1} French Land Register data, which excludes lakes, ponds, glaciers > 1 km^{2} (0.386 sq mi or 247 acres) and river estuaries.

Longueville-sur-Scie (French pronunciation: [lɔ̃ɡvil syʁ si], literally Longueville on Scie) is a commune in the Seine-Maritime department in the Normandy region in northern France.

== Geography ==
A farming village situated by the banks of the river Scie in the Pays de Caux, some 9 miles (14 km) south of Dieppe at the junction of the D77, the D149 and the D3 roads. The commune is served by the TER railway between Dieppe and Rouen.

== Coat of arms ==
Arms of Longueville-sur-Scie	The arms of Longueville-sur-Scie are blazoned : Gules, a triple-towered castle argent masoned sable with a portcullis Or, in sinister chief a falcon volant sable.

== Population ==
Historical population
Year	Pop.	±% p.a.
1968	801	—
1975	764	−0.67%
1982	844	+1.43%
1990	820	−0.36%
1999	936	+1.48%
2007	947	+0.15%
2012	975	+0.58%
2017	980	+0.10%
2023	900	−1.41%
Source: INSEE

== Places of interest ==
- The church of St.Pierre, dating from the eleventh century.
- Ruins of an 11th-century castle, built by Walter Giffard, Lord of Longueville.

== Miscellany ==
The village was formerly known as Longueville-le-Giffard, one of its sons was Osbern Giffard, who gave his name to Stoke Gifford, South Gloucestershire, England.

Longueville-sur-Scie is twinned with Newton Longville in Buckinghamshire, England.

== See also ==
- Communes of the Seine-Maritime department
