= Arboretum du Grenouillet =

Arboretum in Languedoc-Roussillon, France

Coordinates: 43.88°N 3.626°E

The Arboretum du Grenouillet is an arboretum located within the Parc National des Cévennes, in Gorniès, Hérault, Languedoc-Roussillon, France. It is open daily without charge.

The arboretum was created in 1905 by Charles Flahault (1852–1935), and contains species including Abies numidica, Acer campestris, Alnus glutinosa, Fraxinus ornus, Ginkgo biloba, Larix spp., Maclura pomifera, Populus tremulus, Sequoiadendron, Taxus baccata, and Toxylon pomiferum.

== See also ==
- List of botanical gardens in France
