= Théodore-Éloi Lebreton =

French poet, chansonnier and bibliographer

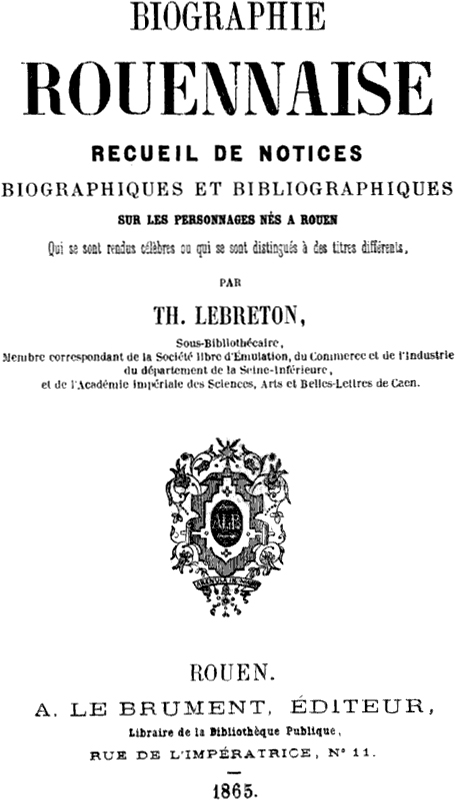
- Biographie rouennaise by Théodore-Éloi Lebreton.
- Born: 1 December 1803; Rouen
- Died: 12 December 1883 (aged 80); Rouen
- Occupations: Bibliograph; Poet; Chansonnier

Théodore-Éloi Lebreton (1 December 1803 – 12 December 1883) was a 19th-century autodidact French poet, chansonnier and bibliographer.

== Biography ==
Born as the child of a day laborer father and a washerwoman mother, Lebreton entered at age seven in an indienne factory in his hometown where he was taught the printing trade on fabrics. Barely able to spell, he learned, through perseverance, to read and write and, after a few years, he felt the desire to tell what he felt. Aged fourteen, he had succeeded, through saving his salary to complete his education by going to the theater, to be a great worker and educated in his workshop. The taste of poetry being born in him, he was induced by the inspiration and breathed in to the impressions of his soul, his pains, joys, hopes and loves. Marceline Desbordes-Valmore presented the poet's essays to Le Journal de Rouen and eventually, in 1836, a man of letters from Rouen, Ch. Richard, drew attention on him by writing a sketch of his life as a worker and thinker and contributed to the publication of a collection of his poems. Until then, Lebreton had remained in his workshop but by that time, the city of Rouen having acquired the Leber collection of books, Lebreton was appointed to the newly created position of sub-librarian at Rouen library to administer it.

In 1848, Lebreton was elected to represent the Seine-Inférieure department at the Assemblée constituante but wasn't reelected to the Assemblée législative.

A religious poet, Lebreton, in his first poems, painted the misery of the worker without seeing no other remedy than resignation on earth and rest in heaven; Later, his outrage took a keener focus without going further. A member of several learned societies, this humble man also published several songbooks in his hometown of Rouen, although he was much better known in Paris.

Lebreton's great work is his Biographie normande; recueil de notices biographiques et bibliographiques sur les personnages célèbres nés en Normandie et sur ceux qui se sont seulement distingués par leurs actions et par leurs écrits et sa Biographie rouennaise; recueil de notices biographiques et bibliographiques sur les personnages célèbres nés à Rouen qui se sont rendus célèbres ou qui se sont distingués à des titres différents.

He also wrote Corneille chez le savetier, scène historique de la vie de Pierre Corneille, in collaboration with M. Beuzeville presented at the Théâtre des Arts de Rouen 29 June 1841.

== Publications ==
- 1867–1861: Biographie normande; recueil de notices biographiques et bibliographiques sur les personnages célèbres nés en Normandie et sur ceux qui se sont seulement distingués par leurs actions et par leurs écrits, Rouen, Le Brument
- 1865: Biographie rouennaise; recueil de notices biographiques et bibliographiques sur les personnages célèbres nés à Rouen qui se sont rendus célèbres ou qui se sont distingués à des titres différents, Rouen, Le Brument
- 1869: À la France ! cantate chantée au théâtre du cirque impérial à l’occasion du centenaire de Napoléon Ier, Rouen, Orville and Joignant
- 1841: Baptême de S. A. R. Mgr le comte de Paris, cantate [25 avril 1841], Rouen, Nicétas Périaux
- 1839: Candidature de Théodore Lebreton, ouvrier-poète, actuellement attaché à la Bibliothèque de Rouen : aux électeurs du Département de la Seine-Inférieure, Rouen, [s.n.]
- 1841: Corneille chez le savetier, scène historique de la vie de Pierre Corneille, Rouen, Nicétas Périaux
- 1845: Espoir, poésies nouvelles, Éd. Amélie Bosquet, Paris, Comptoir des imprimeurs unis
- 1842: Géricault, dithyrambe, Rouen, Nicétas Périaux
- 1837: Heures de repos d’un ouvrier, Rouen, E. Le Grand
- 1834: Hommage au grand Corneille, Rouen, F. Baudry
- 1841: Jeanne d'Arc et Pierre Corneille, Rouen, I.-S. Lefèvre
- 1800: La Marseillaise des travailleurs : chant national, [S.l.], Lecointe frères
- 1842: La Mort de Mgr le duc d’Orléans. Juillet 1842, Rouen, Nicétas Périaux
- 1859: La Paix de Villafranca, Rouen, Giroux et Renaux
- 1842: Les Inondations. Pèlerinage à Fécamp, Yport, Vaucotte et Étretat. Pièces de vers, Rouen, Nicétas Périaux
- 1833: L’Oiseau captif, Souffrances d’hiver de Turquety, Paris, L. Boitel
- 1842: Nouvelles Heures de repos d’un ouvrier, Rouen, Nicétas Périaux
- 1834: Ode sur la mort de Boïeldieu, Rouen, F. Baudry
- 1853: Un jardin et une église de Rouen, Rouen, D. Brière

== Sources ==
- Ferdinand Hoefer, Nouvelle Biographie Générale, t. 30, Paris, Firmin-Didot, 1855, (p. 128–9).
- Noémi-Noire Oursel, Nouvelle Biographie normande, Paris, A. Picard, 1886, (p. 73).
- "Théodore-Éloi Lebreton", in Adolphe Robert and Gaston Cougny, Dictionnaire des parlementaires français (1789–1891), Bourloton, Paris, 1889 Edition details Wikisource
