= Sévis =

- Part of Val-de-Scie
- Location of Sévis
- Location within France Location within Normandy
- Coordinates: 49°42′32″N 1°09′50″E
- Country: France
- Region: Normandy
- Department: Seine-Maritime
- Arrondissement: Dieppe
- Canton: Luneray
- Commune: Val-de-Scie
- Area^{1}: 6.4 km^{2} (2.5 sq mi)
- Elevation: 154 m (505 ft)
- Highest elevation: 172 m (564 ft)
- Lowest elevation: 66 m (217 ft)
- Population (2022): 394
  - Density: 62/km^{2} (160/sq mi)
- Time zone: UTC+01:00 (CET)
  - Summer (DST): UTC+02:00 (CEST)
- Postal code: 76850
- ^{1} French Land Register data, which excludes lakes, ponds, glaciers > 1 km^{2} (0.386 sq mi or 247 acres) and river estuaries.

Sévis (French pronunciation: [sevi]) is a former commune in the Seine-Maritime department in the Normandy region in northern France. On 1 January 2019, it was merged into the new commune Val-de-Scie.

== Geography ==
A farming village situated in the Pays de Bray, some 16 miles (26 km) south of Dieppe, at the junction of the D48 and D15 roads.

== Population ==
Historical population
Year	Pop.	±% p.a.
1962	300	—
1968	274	−1.50%
1975	234	−2.23%
1982	260	+1.52%
1990	297	+1.68%
1999	283	−0.54%
2013	381	+2.15%
2022	394	+0.37%
Source: EHESS and INSEE

== Places of interest ==
- The church of St. Pierre, dating from the eleventh century.
- A sixteenth-century chateau.

== See also ==
- Communes of the Seine-Maritime department
