= Rosay, Seine-Maritime =

Rosay
- Commune
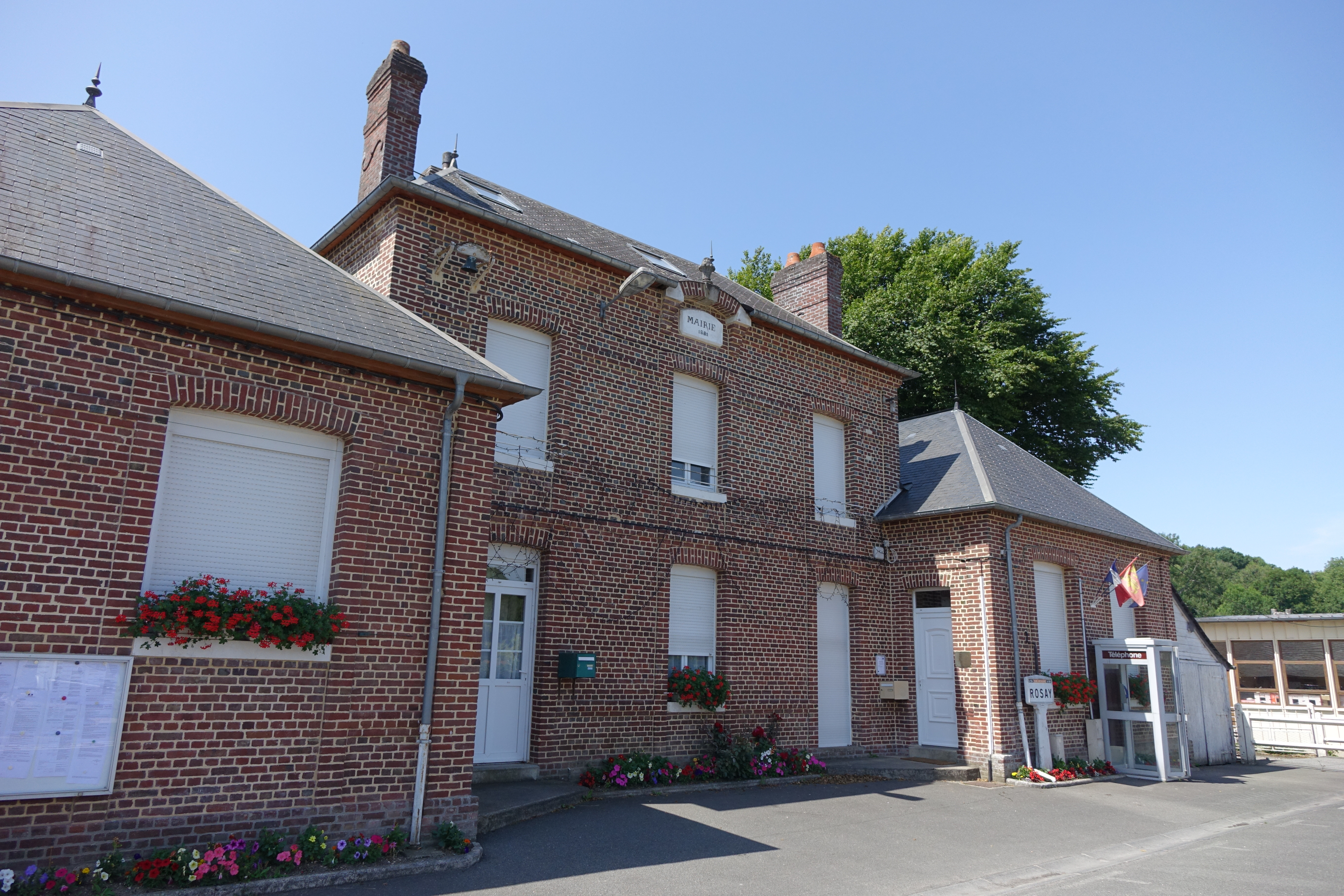
- The town hall in Rosay
- Location of Rosay
- Location within France Location within Normandy
- Coordinates: 49°41′45″N 1°14′47″E
- Country: France
- Region: Normandy
- Department: Seine-Maritime
- Arrondissement: Dieppe
- Canton: Neufchâtel-en-Bray
- Intercommunality: CC Bray-Eawy

Government
  - Mayor (2026–32): Joëlle Laurence
- Area^{1}: 10.46 km^{2} (4.04 sq mi)
- Elevation: 86 m (282 ft)
- Highest elevation: 207 m (679 ft)
- Lowest elevation: 80 m (260 ft)
- Population (2023): 258
  - Density: 24.7/km^{2} (63.9/sq mi)
- Time zone: UTC+01:00 (CET)
  - Summer (DST): UTC+02:00 (CEST)
- INSEE/Postal code: 76538 /76680
- ^{1} French Land Register data, which excludes lakes, ponds, glaciers > 1 km^{2} (0.386 sq mi or 247 acres) and river estuaries.

Rosay (French pronunciation: [ʁozɛ]) is a commune in the Seine-Maritime department in the Normandy region in northern France.

== Geography ==
A forestry and farming village situated by the banks of the river Varenne in the Pays de Bray at the junction of the D195, D97 and the D98 roads, some 16 miles (26 km) south of Dieppe.

== Population ==
Historical population
Year	Pop.	±% p.a.
1968	301	—
1975	267	−1.70%
1982	251	−0.88%
1990	280	+1.38%
1999	252	−1.16%
2007	265	+0.63%
2012	271	+0.45%
2017	267	−0.30%
2023	258	−0.57%
Source: INSEE

== Places of interest ==
- The twelfth century church of St. Etienne.
- A museum of cider.

== See also ==
- Communes of the Seine-Maritime department
