= Cressy, Seine-Maritime =

Part of Val-de-Scie in Normandy, France

Cressy
- Part of Val-de-Scie
- Coat of arms
- Location of Cressy
- Location within France Location within Normandy
- Coordinates: 49°43′25″N 1°10′00″E
- Country: France
- Region: Normandy
- Department: Seine-Maritime
- Arrondissement: Dieppe
- Canton: Neufchâtel-en-Bray
- Commune: Val-de-Scie
- Area^{1}: 4.35 km^{2} (1.68 sq mi)
- Elevation: 150 m (490 ft)
- Highest elevation: 163 m (535 ft)
- Lowest elevation: 80 m (260 ft)
- Population (2023): 292
  - Density: 67.1/km^{2} (174/sq mi)
- Time zone: UTC+01:00 (CET)
  - Summer (DST): UTC+02:00 (CEST)
- Postal code: 76720
- ^{1} French Land Register data, which excludes lakes, ponds, glaciers > 1 km^{2} (0.386 sq mi or 247 acres) and river estuaries.

Cressy (French pronunciation: [kʁesi]) is a former commune in the Seine-Maritime department in the Normandy region in north-western France. On 1 January 2019, it was merged into the new commune Val-de-Scie.

== Geography ==
A farming village situated in the Pays de Caux, some 31 kilometres (19 mi) south of Dieppe, at the junction of the D22 and the D296 roads.

=== Heraldry ===
Arms of Cressy	The arms of Cressy are blazoned : Argent, a bendlet vert, overall a lion queue forché sable, armed and langued gules, on a chief wavy gules, a latin cross and a leopard Or.

== Places of interest ==
- The church of Notre-Dame, dating from the twelfth century.
- An eighteenth-century presbytery, now the town hall.
- A stone cross from the thirteenth century.

== See also ==
- Communes of the Seine-Maritime department
