= Pommeréval =

- Commune
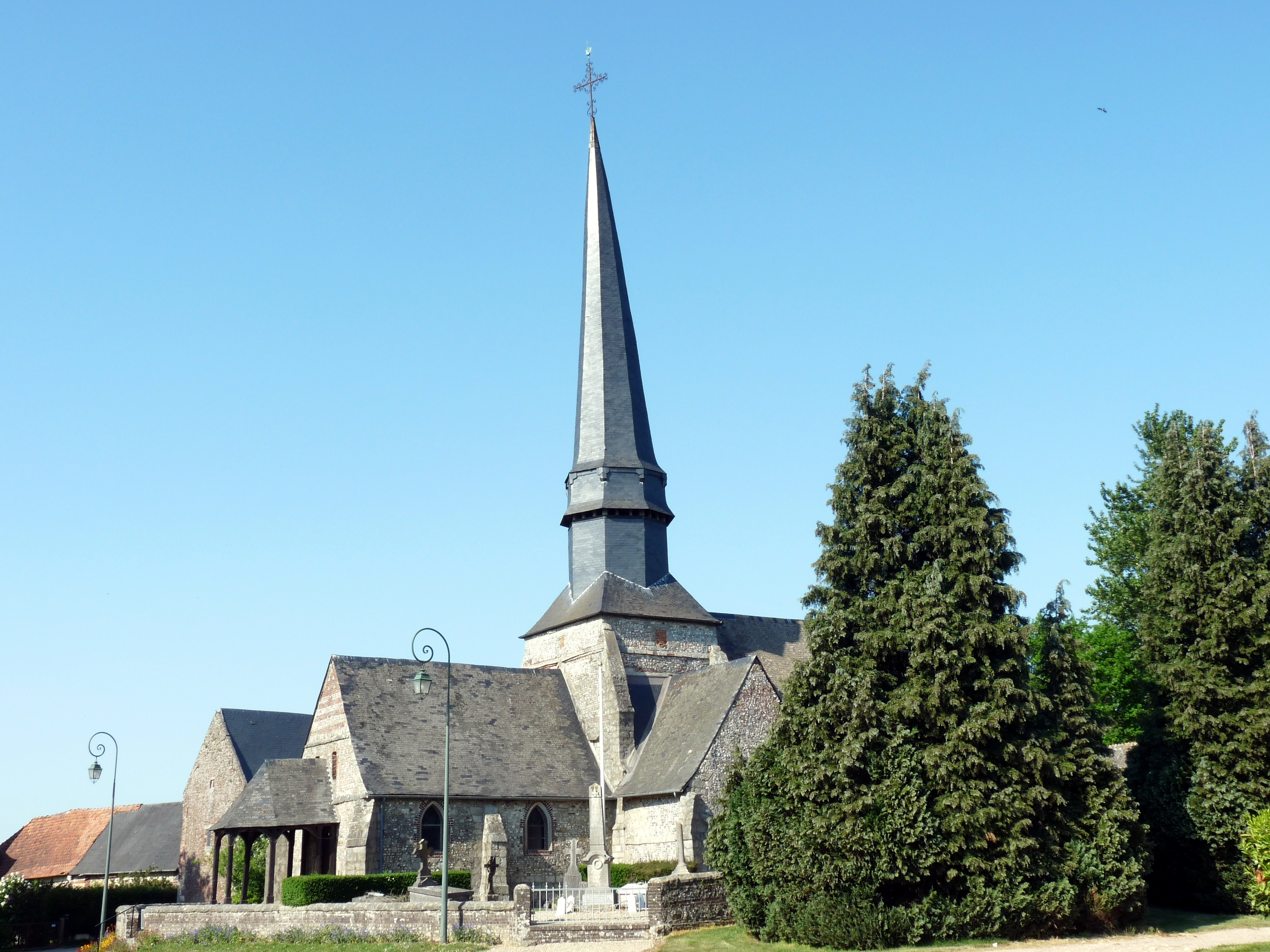
- The church in Pommeréval
- Location of Pommeréval
- Location within France Location within Normandy
- Coordinates: 49°44′14″N 1°18′53″E
- Country: France
- Region: Normandy
- Department: Seine-Maritime
- Arrondissement: Dieppe
- Canton: Neufchâtel-en-Bray
- Intercommunality: CC Bray-Eawy

Government
  - Mayor (2026–32): Sophie Tourneur
- Area^{1}: 7.6 km^{2} (2.9 sq mi)
- Elevation: 210 m (690 ft)
- Highest elevation: 213 m (699 ft)
- Lowest elevation: 117 m (384 ft)
- Population (2023): 496
  - Density: 65/km^{2} (170/sq mi)
- Time zone: UTC+01:00 (CET)
  - Summer (DST): UTC+02:00 (CEST)
- INSEE/Postal code: 76506 /76680
- ^{1} French Land Register data, which excludes lakes, ponds, glaciers > 1 km^{2} (0.386 sq mi or 247 acres) and river estuaries.

Pommeréval (French pronunciation: [pɔmʁeval]) is a commune in the Seine-Maritime department in the Normandy region in northern France.

== Geography ==
A forestry and farming village situated at the edge of the forest of Eawy in the Pays de Bray at the junction of the D12 and the D915 roads, some 18 miles (29 km) southeast of Dieppe.

== Population ==
Historical population
Year	Pop.	±% p.a.
1968	271	—
1975	224	−2.68%
1982	243	+1.17%
1990	288	+2.15%
1999	289	+0.04%
2007	362	+2.86%
2012	409	+2.47%
2017	463	+2.51%
2023	496	+1.15%
Source: INSEE

== Places of interest ==
- The church of St.Jacques, dating from the seventeenth century.
- Traces of a feudal castle.

== See also ==
- Communes of the Seine-Maritime department
