= Saint-Hellier =

- Commune
- Location of Saint-Hellier
- Location within France Location within Normandy
- Coordinates: 49°43′56″N 1°11′29″E
- Country: France
- Region: Normandy
- Department: Seine-Maritime
- Arrondissement: Dieppe
- Canton: Neufchâtel-en-Bray
- Intercommunality: CC Bray-Eawy

Government
  - Mayor (2020–2026): Alain Lucas
- Area^{1}: 14.22 km^{2} (5.49 sq mi)
- Elevation: 70 m (230 ft)
- Highest elevation: 189 m (620 ft)
- Lowest elevation: 52 m (171 ft)
- Population (2023): 521
  - Density: 36.6/km^{2} (94.9/sq mi)
- Time zone: UTC+01:00 (CET)
  - Summer (DST): UTC+02:00 (CEST)
- INSEE/Postal code: 76588 /76680
- ^{1} French Land Register data, which excludes lakes, ponds, glaciers > 1 km^{2} (0.386 sq mi or 247 acres) and river estuaries.

Saint-Hellier (French pronunciation: [sɛ̃.t‿elje]) is a commune in the Seine-Maritime department in the Normandy region in northern France.

== Geography ==
A forestry and farming village situated by the banks of the river Varenne in the Pays de Caux, at the junction of the D15, the D76 and the D154 road, some 16 miles (26 km) south of Dieppe.

== Population ==
Historical population
Year	Pop.	±% p.a.
1968	348	—
1975	334	−0.58%
1982	404	+2.76%
1990	405	+0.03%
1999	419	+0.38%
2007	422	+0.09%
2012	432	+0.47%
2017	459	+1.22%
2023	521	+2.13%
Source: INSEE

== Places of interest ==
- The church of St. Hellier, dating from the eleventh century.
- The chapel of Saint-Sauveur at La Frenaye built in 1788.
- The seventeenth century chapel of Saint-Paër at Orival-sous-Bellencombre.

== See also ==
- Communes of the Seine-Maritime department
