= Yvrench =

- Commune
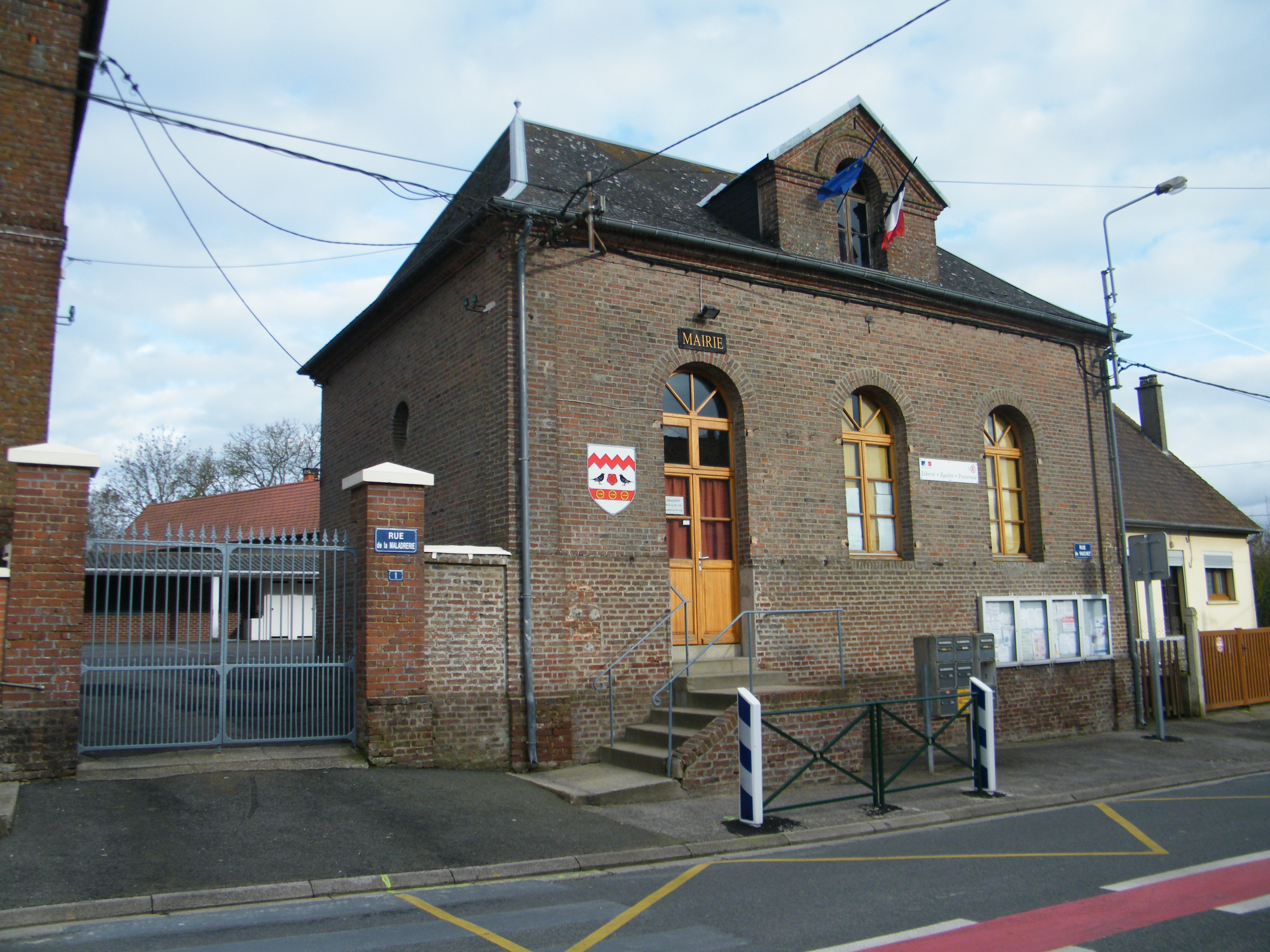
- The town hall in Yvrench

- Coat of arms
- Location of Yvrench
- Location within France Location within Hauts-de-France
- Coordinates: 50°10′46″N 2°00′19″E
- Country: France
- Region: Hauts-de-France
- Department: Somme
- Arrondissement: Abbeville
- Canton: Rue
- Intercommunality: Ponthieu-Marquenterre

Government
  - Mayor (2020–2026): Valérie-Anne Canal
- Area^{1}: 9.29 km^{2} (3.59 sq mi)
- Elevation: 120 m (390 ft)
- Highest elevation: 130 m (430 ft)
- Lowest elevation: 85 m (279 ft)
- Population (2023): 296
  - Density: 31.9/km^{2} (82.5/sq mi)
- Time zone: UTC+01:00 (CET)
  - Summer (DST): UTC+02:00 (CEST)
- INSEE/Postal code: 80832 /80150
- ^{1} French Land Register data, which excludes lakes, ponds, glaciers > 1 km^{2} (0.386 sq mi or 247 acres) and river estuaries.

Yvrench is a commune in the Somme department in Hauts-de-France in northern France.

== Geography ==
Yvrench is situated 9 miles(15 km) northeast of Abbeville, on the D108 road, the route of the old Roman road, the Chaussée Brunehaut.

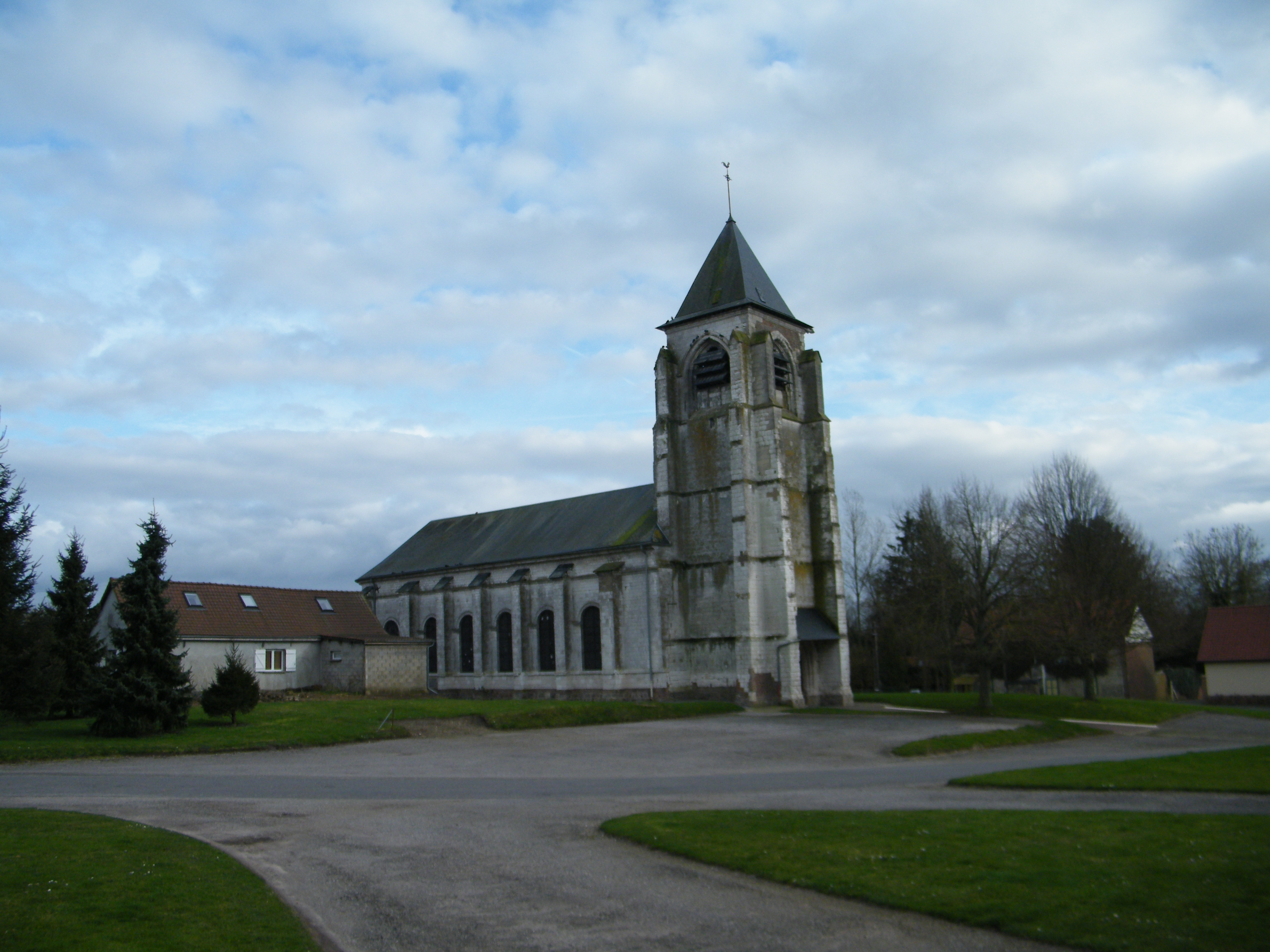
St Martin Church.

== Population ==
Historical population

Year	Pop.	±% p.a.
1793	634	—
1800	683	+1.07%
1806	775	+2.13%
1821	758	−0.15%
1831	721	−0.50%
1836	774	+1.43%
1841	781	+0.18%
1846	800	+0.48%
1851	753	−1.20%
1856	729	−0.65%
1861	704	−0.70%
1866	675	−0.84%
1872	640	−0.88%
1876	612	−1.11%
1881	565	−1.59%
1886	512	−1.95%
1891	481	−1.24%
1896	439	−1.81%
1901	414	−1.17%

Year	Pop.	±% p.a.
1906	416	+0.10%
1911	415	−0.05%
1921	363	−1.33%
1926	344	−1.07%
1931	369	+1.41%
1936	348	−1.17%
1946	328	−0.59%
1954	336	+0.30%
1962	330	−0.22%
1968	315	−0.77%
1975	306	−0.41%
1982	291	−0.72%
1990	291	+0.00%
1999	249	−1.72%
2007	281	+1.52%
2012	310	+1.98%
2017	304	−0.39%
2023	296	−0.44%

Source: EHESS (1793-1999) and INSEE

== See also ==
- Communes of the Somme department
