= Bosc-le-Hard =

- Commune
- Coat of arms
- Location of Bosc-le-Hard
- Location within France Location within Normandy
- Coordinates: 49°37′38″N 1°10′37″E
- Country: France
- Region: Normandy
- Department: Seine-Maritime
- Arrondissement: Rouen
- Canton: Neufchâtel-en-Bray
- Intercommunality: Inter-Caux-Vexin

Government
  - Mayor (2026–32): Philippe Vincent
- Area^{1}: 10.37 km^{2} (4.00 sq mi)
- Elevation: 170 m (560 ft)
- Highest elevation: 176 m (577 ft)
- Lowest elevation: 128 m (420 ft)
- Population (2023): 1,611
  - Density: 155.4/km^{2} (402.4/sq mi)
- Time zone: UTC+01:00 (CET)
  - Summer (DST): UTC+02:00 (CEST)
- INSEE/Postal code: 76125 /76850
- ^{1} French Land Register data, which excludes lakes, ponds, glaciers > 1 km^{2} (0.386 sq mi or 247 acres) and river estuaries.

Bosc-le-Hard is a commune in the Seine-Maritime department in the Normandy region in northern France.

== Geography ==
A village of farming and light industry, situated in the Pays de Bray, some 26 miles (42 km) south of Dieppe, at the junction of the D25 and the D151 roads. The A29 autoroute forms the northern border of the commune.

== Heraldry ==
Arms of Bosc-le-Hard	The arms of Bosc-le-Hard are blazoned : Gules, a pascal lamb Or haloed argent, holding a long cross from which flies a banner Or charged a cross gules, and a chief azure.

== Population ==
Historical population
Year	Pop.	±% p.a.
1968	876	—
1975	1,224	+4.89%
1982	1,178	−0.55%
1990	1,271	+0.95%
1999	1,410	+1.16%
2007	1,438	+0.25%
2012	1,514	+1.04%
2017	1,462	−0.70%
2023	1,611	+1.63%
Source: INSEE

== Places of interest ==
- The church of St.John, dating from the eighteenth century.
- The modern church of St. Eloi.
- The chateau du Réel.
- The chapel at Augeville.

== Twin towns ==
- Goldenstedt, Germany, since 1989

== See also ==
- Communes of the Seine-Maritime department
