= Auffay =

- Part of Val-de-Scie
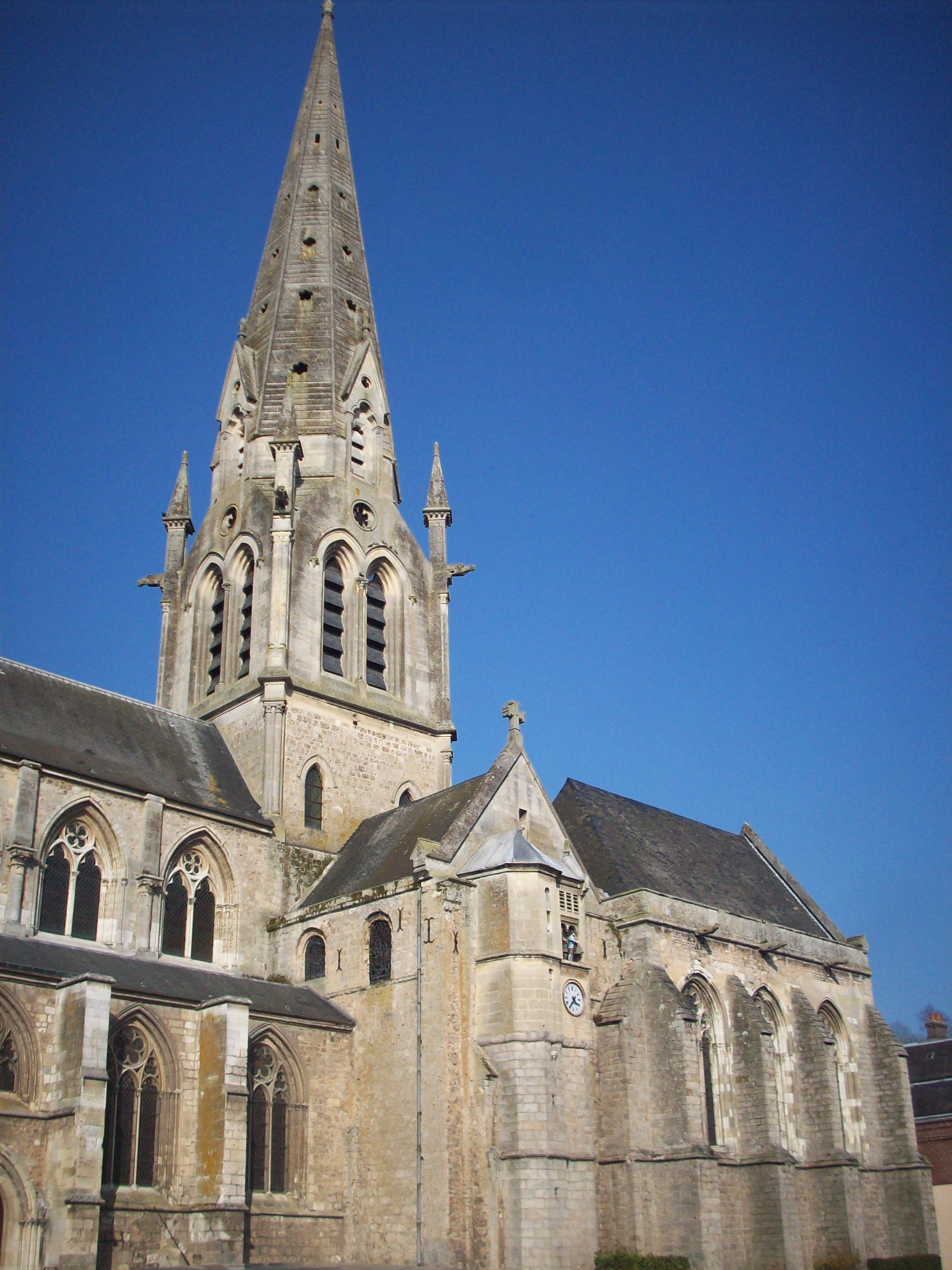
- The church in Auffay

- Coat of arms
- Location of Auffay
- Location within France Location within Normandy
- Coordinates: 49°43′07″N 1°06′04″E
- Country: France
- Region: Normandy
- Department: Seine-Maritime
- Arrondissement: Dieppe
- Canton: Luneray
- Commune: Val-de-Scie
- Area^{1}: 11.3 km^{2} (4.4 sq mi)
- Elevation: 100 m (330 ft)
- Highest elevation: 162 m (531 ft)
- Lowest elevation: 90 m (300 ft)
- Population (2022): 1,846
  - Density: 163/km^{2} (423/sq mi)
- Time zone: UTC+01:00 (CET)
  - Summer (DST): UTC+02:00 (CEST)
- Postal code: 76720
- ^{1} French Land Register data, which excludes lakes, ponds, glaciers > 1 km^{2} (0.386 sq mi or 247 acres) and river estuaries.

Auffay (French pronunciation: [ofɛ]) is a former commune in the Seine-Maritime department in the Normandy region in northern France. On 1 January 2019, it was merged into the new commune Val-de-Scie.

== Geography ==
A village of farming and associated light industry, situated in the valley of the Scie of the Pays de Caux, some 18 miles (29 km) south of Dieppe at the junction of the D50, D22, D3 and D301 roads.

== Heraldry ==
Arms of Auffay	The arms of Auffay are blazoned : Azure, a beech tree proper impaled with Gules, an episcopal crozier and a sword inverted in saltire argent.

== Population ==
Historical population
Year	Pop.	±% p.a.
1962	1,448	—
1968	1,432	−0.19%
1975	1,702	+2.50%
1982	1,788	+0.71%
1990	1,888	+0.68%
1999	1,872	−0.09%
2006	1,757	−0.90%
2022	1,846	+0.31%
Source: EHESS and INSEE

== Places of interest ==
- The collegial church of Notre-Dame, dating from the eleventh century.
- The eighteenth-century stone cross.
- The seventeenth-century château du Bosmelet.

== Twin towns ==
- Bleckede, Germany since 1977
- Monreal del Campo, Spain

== See also ==
- Communes of the Seine-Maritime department
