= Gorniès =

- Commune
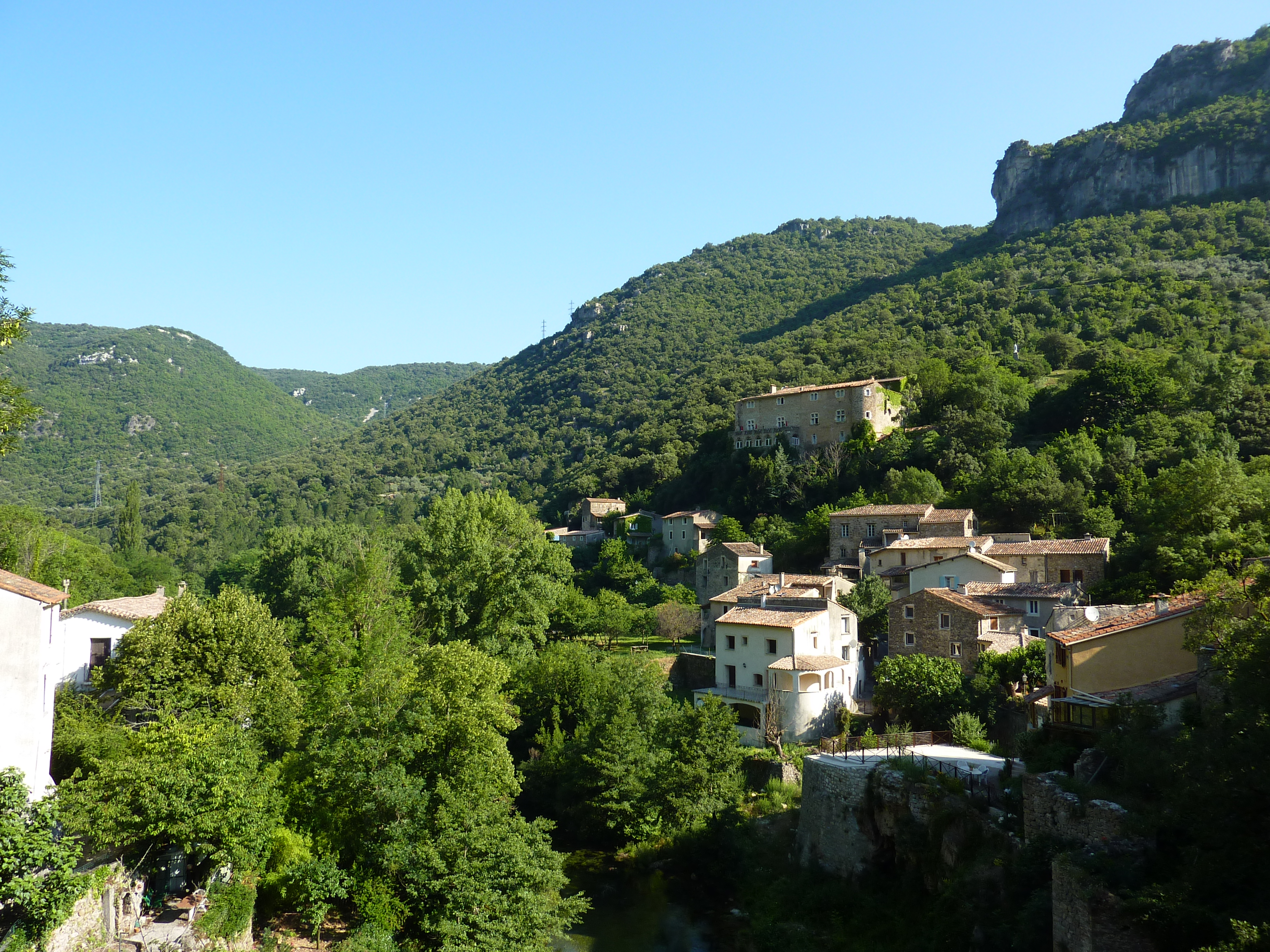
- A general view of Gorniès

- Coat of arms
- Location of Gorniès
- Location within France Location within Occitanie
- Coordinates: 43°53′21″N 3°37′32″E
- Country: France
- Region: Occitania
- Department: Hérault
- Arrondissement: Lodève
- Canton: Lodève
- Intercommunality: Cévennes Gangeoises et Suménoises

Government
  - Mayor (2020–2026): Joël Povreau
- Area^{1}: 29.31 km^{2} (11.32 sq mi)
- Elevation: 225 m (738 ft)
- Highest elevation: 940 m (3,080 ft)
- Lowest elevation: 176 m (577 ft)
- Population (2023): 103
  - Density: 3.51/km^{2} (9.10/sq mi)
- Time zone: UTC+01:00 (CET)
  - Summer (DST): UTC+02:00 (CEST)
- INSEE/Postal code: 34115 /34190
- ^{1} French Land Register data, which excludes lakes, ponds, glaciers > 1 km^{2} (0.386 sq mi or 247 acres) and river estuaries.

Gorniès (French pronunciation: [ɡɔʁnjɛs]; Occitan: Gornièrs) is a commune in the Hérault département in the Occitanie region in southern France. The river Vis flows through the commune.

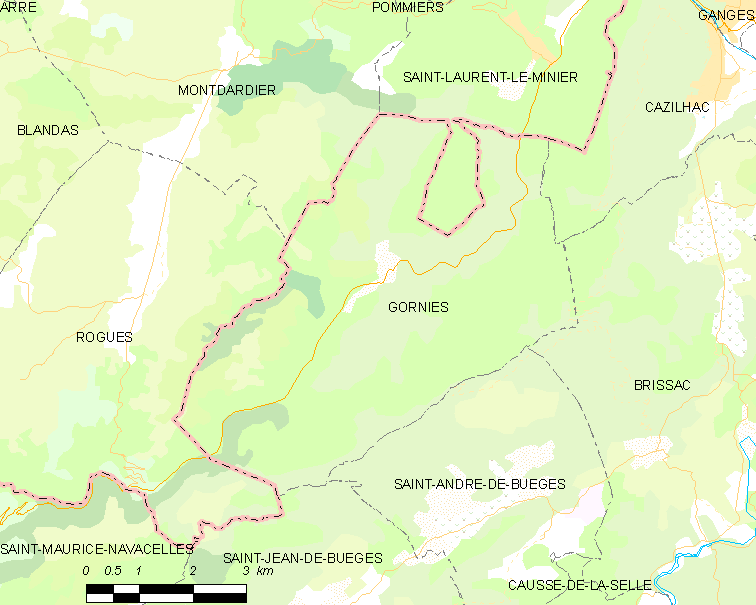
Map

== Population ==
Historical population
Year	Pop.	±% p.a.
1968	110	—
1975	109	−0.13%
1982	131	+2.66%
1990	136	+0.47%
1999	121	−1.29%
2007	116	−0.53%
2012	114	−0.35%
2017	127	+2.18%
2023	103	−3.43%
Source: INSEE

== Sights ==
- Arboretum du Grenouillet

== See also ==
- Communes of the Hérault department
