= Scie (river) =

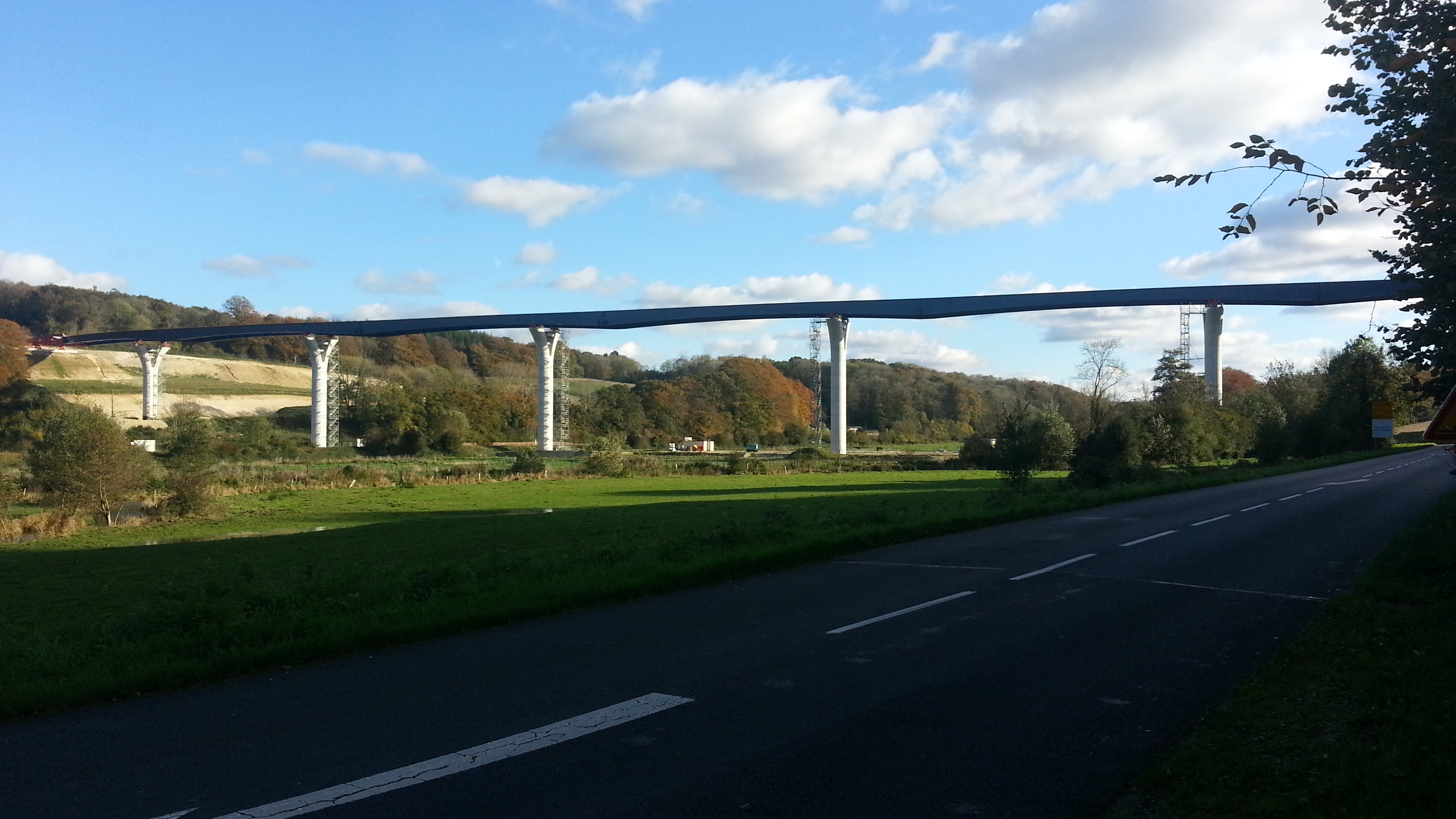
- The Scie at the tripoint of Sauqueville, Manéhouville and Anneville-sur-Scie looking upstream.

- Native name: La Scie (French)

Location
- Country: France

Physical characteristics
- Source
  - location: Pays de Caux
  - elevation: 140 m (460 ft)
- Mouth
  - location: English Channel
  - coordinates: 49°55′5″N 1°1′54″E
- Length: 38 km (24 mi)
- Basin size: 217 km^{2} (84 sq mi)
- Discharge
  - average: 1.8 m^{3}/s (64 cu ft/s)

The Scie (French pronunciation: [si]) is a river that flows from the plateau of the southern Pays de Caux in the Seine-Maritime département of Normandy into the English Channel. It is 38 km (24 mi) long.

The river rises at Saint-Victor-l'Abbaye and passes through Auffay, Saint-Maclou-de-Folleville, Longueville-sur-Scie, Anneville-sur-Scie, Heugleville-sur-Scie, Saint-Aubin-sur-Scie and finally Hautot-sur-Mer.

== Economy ==
In the past, the river was host to 43 watermills that powered machinery to process wheat, cotton, tannin and flax for linen. Two mills still exist today, at Saint-Maclou-de-Folleville (the moulin of Arbalète) and at Auffay. Today, the activities of the valley includes the production of apples and cider.

== See also ==
- French water management scheme
