= Noémi-Noire Oursel =

French librarian and biographer

- Born: 15 October 1847; Rouen, Normandy, France
- Died: unknown date, 20th century unknown place
- Occupations: librarian, biographer

Noémi-Noire Oursel (15 October 1847, Rouen - unknown date, 20th century) was a French librarian and biographer. In addition to many articles in several magazines, la Normandie Littéraire, le Voleur illustré, etc., Oursel published her great work, the Nouvelle Biographie normande in 1886, followed by two Suppléments (1888 and 1912).

== Works ==
- Nouvelle Biographie normande, Paris, Picard, 1886.
- Supplément à la Nouvelle Biographie normande, Paris, Picard, 1888.
- Nouvelle Biographie normande. Deuxième supplément, Paris, E. Dumont, 1912.
- Une Havraise oubliée, Marie Le Masson Le Golft, Évreux, Imprimerie de l’Eure, 1908.

== Sources ==
- Angelo De Gubernatis, Dictionnaire international des écrivains du jour, Florence, L. Niccolai, 1891, p. 1563-4.
