= Ventes-Saint-Rémy =

- Commune
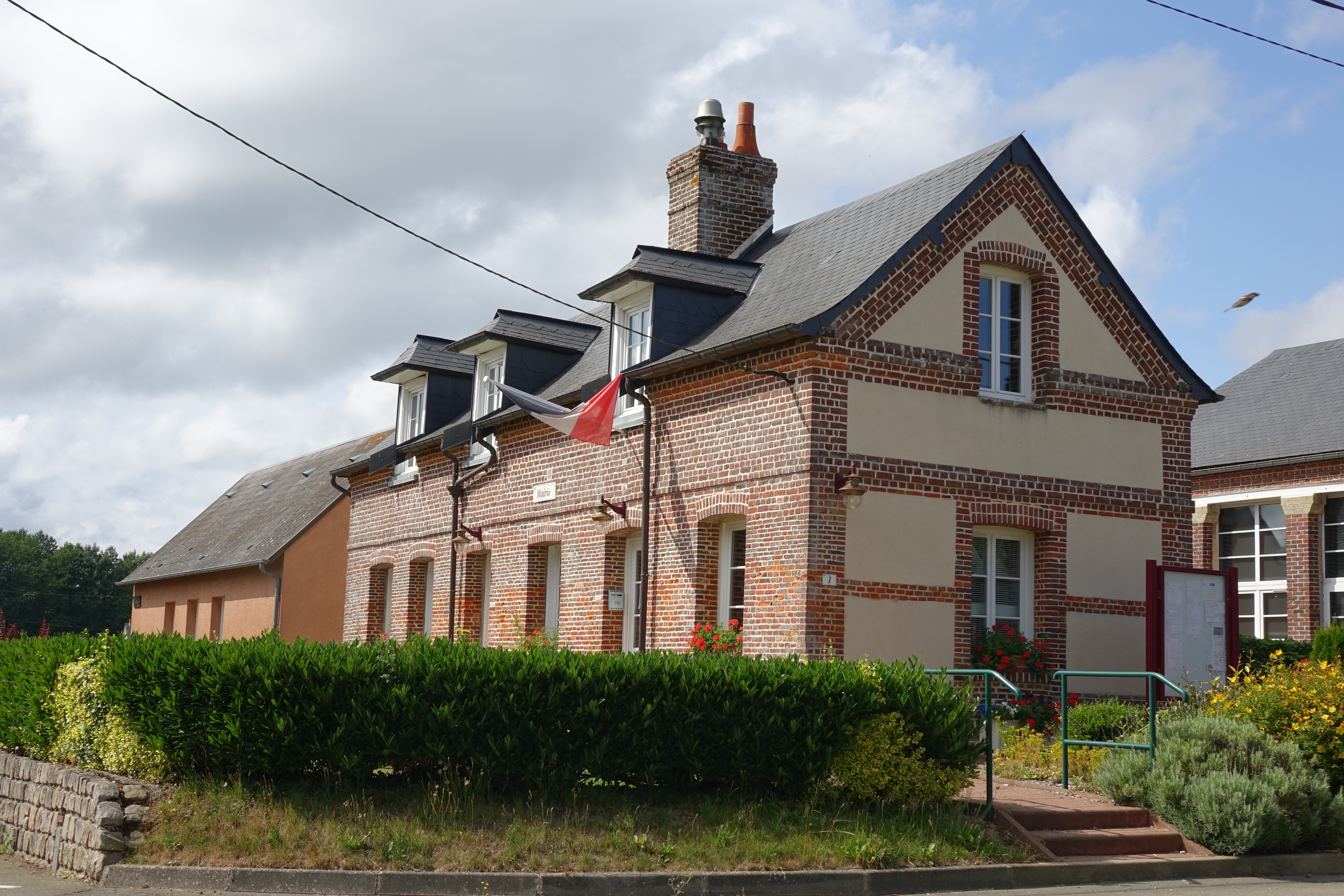
- The town hall in Ventes-Saint-Rémy
- Location of Ventes-Saint-Rémy
- Location within France Location within Normandy
- Coordinates: 49°42′34″N 1°18′18″E
- Country: France
- Region: Normandy
- Department: Seine-Maritime
- Arrondissement: Dieppe
- Canton: Neufchâtel-en-Bray
- Intercommunality: CC Bray-Eawy

Government
  - Mayor (2026–32): Sébastien Declercq
- Area^{1}: 6.12 km^{2} (2.36 sq mi)
- Elevation: 220 m (720 ft)
- Highest elevation: 217 m (712 ft)
- Lowest elevation: 114 m (374 ft)
- Population (2023): 210
  - Density: 34/km^{2} (89/sq mi)
- Time zone: UTC+01:00 (CET)
  - Summer (DST): UTC+02:00 (CEST)
- INSEE/Postal code: 76733 /76680
- ^{1} French Land Register data, which excludes lakes, ponds, glaciers > 1 km^{2} (0.386 sq mi or 247 acres) and river estuaries.

Ventes-Saint-Rémy (French pronunciation: [vɑ̃t sɛ̃ ʁemi]) is a commune in the Seine-Maritime department in the Normandy region in northern France.

== Geography ==
A small forestry and farming village set in the middle of the forest of Eawy in the Pays de Bray, some 18 miles (29 km) southeast of Dieppe at the junction of the D118 and the D12.

== Population ==
Historical population
Year	Pop.	±% p.a.
1968	204	—
1975	161	−3.33%
1982	176	+1.28%
1990	207	+2.05%
1999	218	+0.58%
2007	232	+0.78%
2012	226	−0.52%
2017	226	+0.00%
2023	210	−1.22%
Source: INSEE

== Places of interest ==
- The church of St. Remi, dating from the nineteenth century.
- The tomb of Charles Lemercier de Longpré, Baron d'Haussez, Navy Minister under Charles X of France.

== See also ==
- Communes of the Seine-Maritime department
