= Communauté de communes d'Yères et Plateaux =

Coordinates: 50.0156°N 1.3177°E

Yères et Plateaux
- Former communauté de communes
- Interactive map of Yères et Plateaux
- Country: France
- Region: Normandy
- Department: Seine-Maritime
- No. of communes: {{{nbcomm}}}
- Established: 2003
- Disbanded: 2017
- Population (1999): 7,171

The Communauté de communes d'Yères et Plateaux was located in the Seine-Maritime département of the Normandy region of northern France. It was created in January 2003. It was dissolved in January 2017.

== Participants ==
The Communauté de communes comprised the following communes:

- Baromesnil
- Canehan
- Criel-sur-Mer
- Cuverville-sur-Yères
- Le Mesnil-Réaume
- Melleville
- Monchy-sur-Eu
- Saint-Martin-le-Gaillard
- Saint-Pierre-en-Val
- Saint-Rémy-Boscrocourt
- Sept-Meules
- Touffreville-sur-Eu
- Villy-sur-Yères

== See also ==
- Communes of the Seine-Maritime department
