= Ponts =

Ponts may refer to:

- Ponts, Lleida, a municipality in the province of Lleida, Catalonia, Spain.
- Ponts, Manche, a commune in the Manche department in the Lower Normandy region in France.
- Ponts-et-Marais, a commune in the Seine-Maritime department in the Haute-Normandie region in France.
