= Étalondes =

- Commune
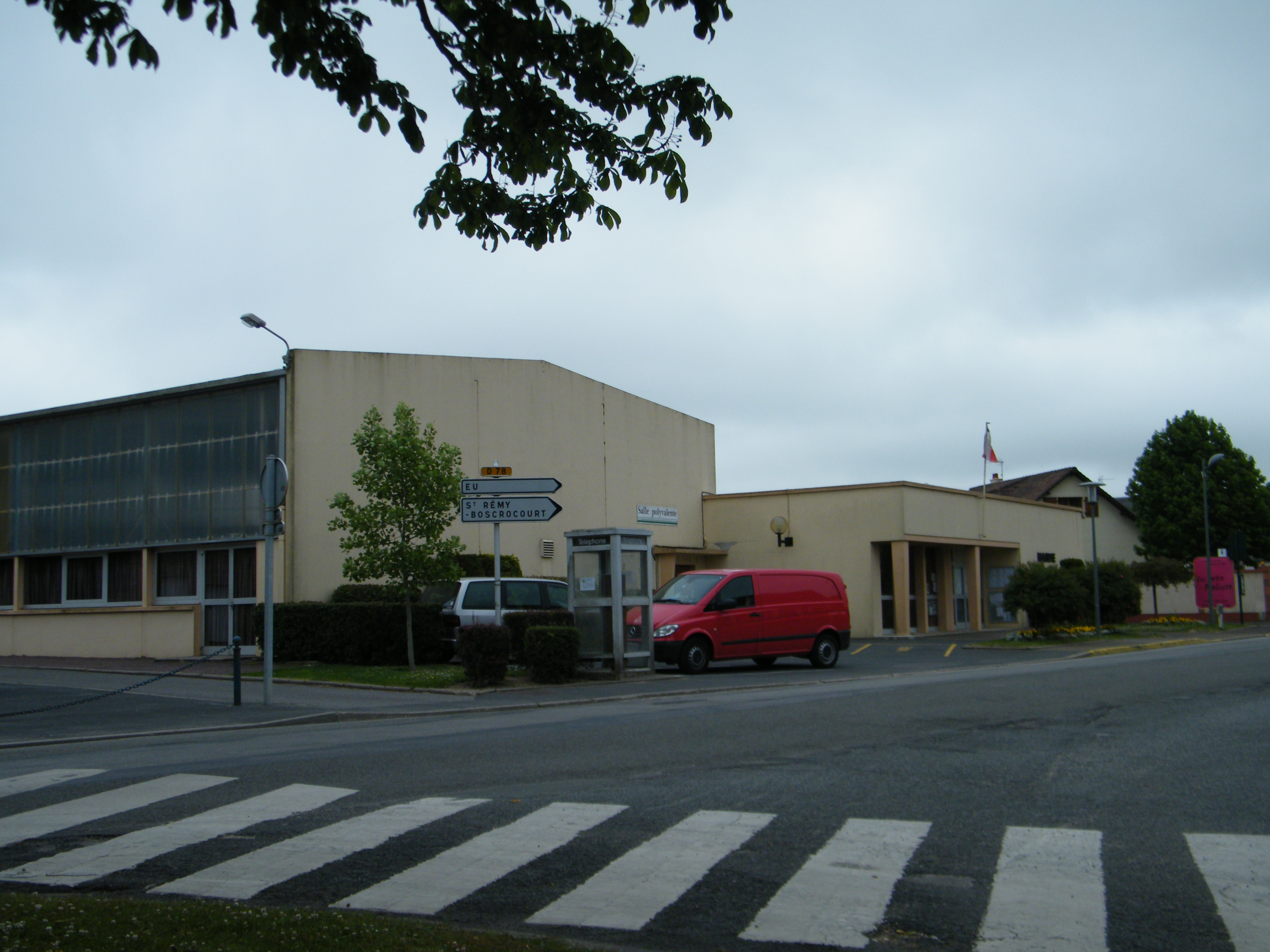
- The town hall in Étalondes
- Location of Étalondes
- Location within France Location within Normandy
- Coordinates: 50°01′51″N 1°23′12″E
- Country: France
- Region: Normandy
- Department: Seine-Maritime
- Arrondissement: Dieppe
- Canton: Eu
- Intercommunality: CC Villes Sœurs

Government
  - Mayor (2026–32): Jean-Marc Gillet
- Area^{1}: 4.63 km^{2} (1.79 sq mi)
- Elevation: 84 m (276 ft)
- Highest elevation: 99 m (325 ft)
- Lowest elevation: 43 m (141 ft)
- Population (2023): 1,068
  - Density: 231/km^{2} (597/sq mi)
- Time zone: UTC+01:00 (CET)
  - Summer (DST): UTC+02:00 (CEST)
- INSEE/Postal code: 76252 /76260
- ^{1} French Land Register data, which excludes lakes, ponds, glaciers > 1 km^{2} (0.386 sq mi or 247 acres) and river estuaries.

Étalondes (French pronunciation: [etalɔ̃d]) is a commune in the Seine-Maritime department in the Normandy region in northern France.

== Geography ==
A village of farming and light industry situated in the Pays de Caux, some 18 miles (29 km) northeast of Dieppe at the junction of the D926, D126 and the D78 roads.

== Population ==
Historical population
Year	Pop.	±% p.a.
1968	499	—
1975	642	+3.67%
1982	787	+2.95%
1990	917	+1.93%
1999	1,030	+1.30%
2007	1,151	+1.40%
2012	1,121	−0.53%
2017	1,057	−1.17%
2023	1,068	+0.17%
Source: INSEE

== Places of interest ==
- The church of Notre-Dame, dating from the nineteenth century.

== See also ==
- Communes of the Seine-Maritime department
