= Flocques =

- Commune
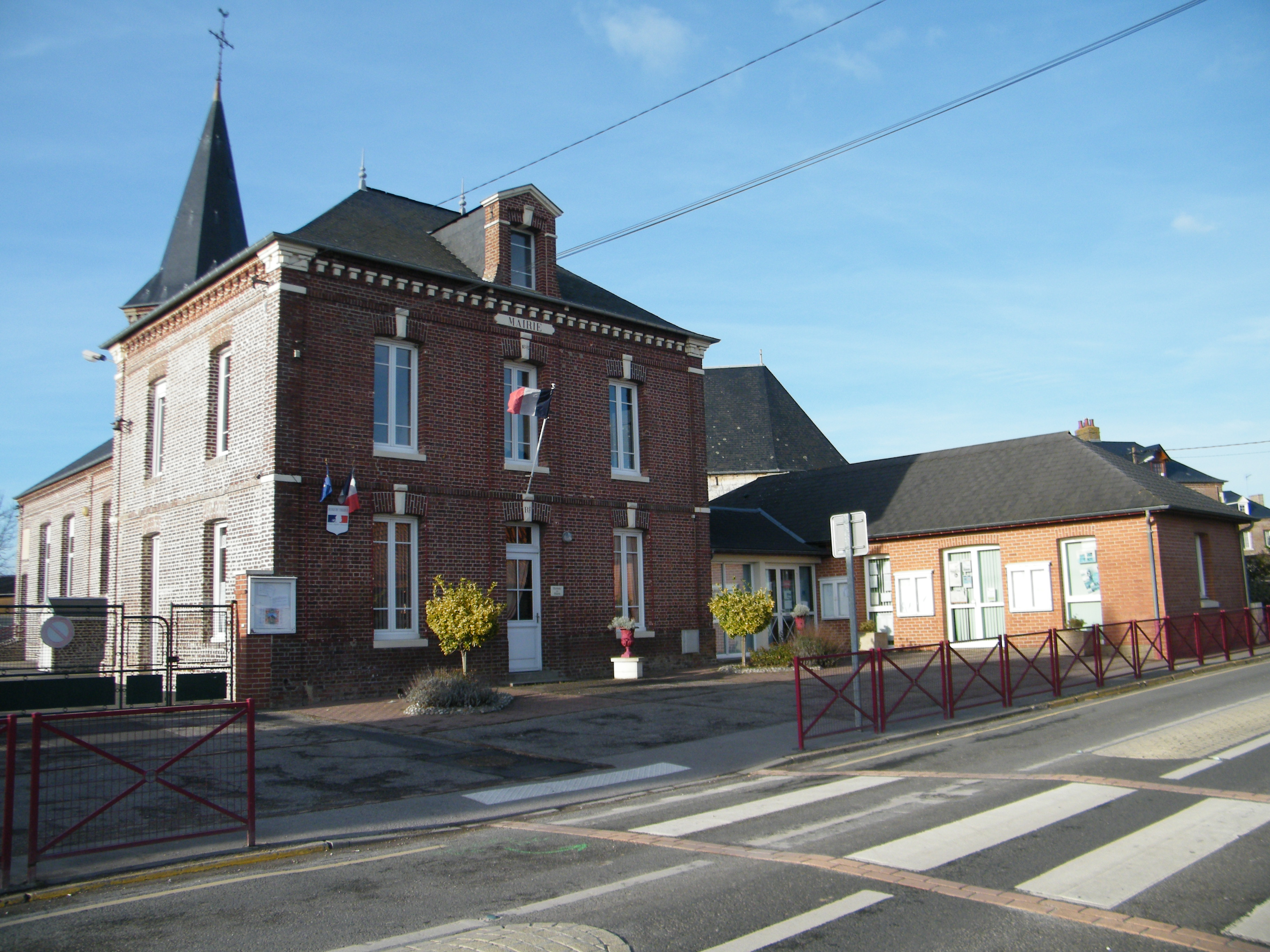
- The town hall in Flocques
- Location of Flocques
- Location within France Location within Normandy
- Coordinates: 50°02′15″N 1°21′52″E
- Country: France
- Region: Normandy
- Department: Seine-Maritime
- Arrondissement: Dieppe
- Canton: Eu
- Intercommunality: CC Villes Sœurs

Government
  - Mayor (2026–32): Eddie Facque
- Area^{1}: 4.93 km^{2} (1.90 sq mi)
- Elevation: 78 m (256 ft)
- Highest elevation: 97 m (318 ft)
- Lowest elevation: 5 m (16 ft)
- Population (2023): 729
  - Density: 148/km^{2} (383/sq mi)
- Time zone: UTC+01:00 (CET)
  - Summer (DST): UTC+02:00 (CEST)
- INSEE/Postal code: 76266 /76260
- ^{1} French Land Register data, which excludes lakes, ponds, glaciers > 1 km^{2} (0.386 sq mi or 247 acres) and river estuaries.

Flocques (French pronunciation: [flɔk]) is a commune in the Seine-Maritime department in the Normandy region in northern France.

== Geography ==
A farming village situated in the Pays de Caux, some 18 miles (29 km) northeast of Dieppe, at the junction of the D126 and the D940 roads.

== Population ==
Historical population
Year	Pop.	±% p.a.
1968	311	—
1975	407	+3.92%
1982	465	+1.92%
1990	646	+4.20%
1999	615	−0.54%
2007	675	+1.17%
2012	713	+1.10%
2017	711	−0.06%
2023	729	+0.42%
Source: INSEE

== Places of interest ==
- The thirteenth century church of Saint-Denis.

== See also ==
- Communes of the Seine-Maritime department
