= Communauté de communes des Villes Sœurs =

Federation of municipalities in France

Coordinates: 50.05°N 1.42°E

Villes Sœurs
- Communauté de communes
- Country: France
- Region: Hauts-de-France, Normandy
- Department: Seine-Maritime, Somme
- No. of communes: {{{nbcomm}}}
- Established: 31 December 1999

Government
  - President: Eddie Facque
- Area: 214.8 km^{2} (82.9 sq mi)
- Population (2018): 36,979
  - Density: 172.2/km^{2} (445.9/sq mi)

The Communauté de communes des Villes Sœurs (before 2017: Communauté de communes interrégionale de Bresle maritime) is a Communauté de communes located in both the Seine-Maritime department (in the Normandy region) and the Somme department (Hauts-de-France region) of north-western France. On 1 January 2017 it was expanded with 7 communes, and renamed Communauté de communes des Villes Sœurs. Its seat is Eu. Its area is 214.8 km^{2}, and its population was 36,979 in 2018, of which 6,771 in Eu and 4,723 in Le Tréport.

== Participants ==
Villes Sœurs consists of the following 28 communes, of which 15 are in Seine-Maritime and 13 are in Somme:

- Allenay
- Ault
- Baromesnil
- Beauchamps
- Bouvaincourt-sur-Bresle
- Buigny-lès-Gamaches
- Criel-sur-Mer
- Dargnies
- Embreville
- Étalondes
- Eu
- Flocques
- Friaucourt
- Gamaches
- Incheville
- Longroy
- Melleville
- Mers-les-Bains
- Le Mesnil-Réaume
- Millebosc
- Monchy-sur-Eu
- Oust-Marest
- Ponts-et-Marais
- Saint-Pierre-en-Val
- Saint-Quentin-la-Motte-Croix-au-Bailly
- Saint-Rémy-Boscrocourt
- Le Tréport
- Woignarue

== See also ==
- Communes of the Seine-Maritime department
- Communes of the Somme department
