= Millebosc =

- Commune
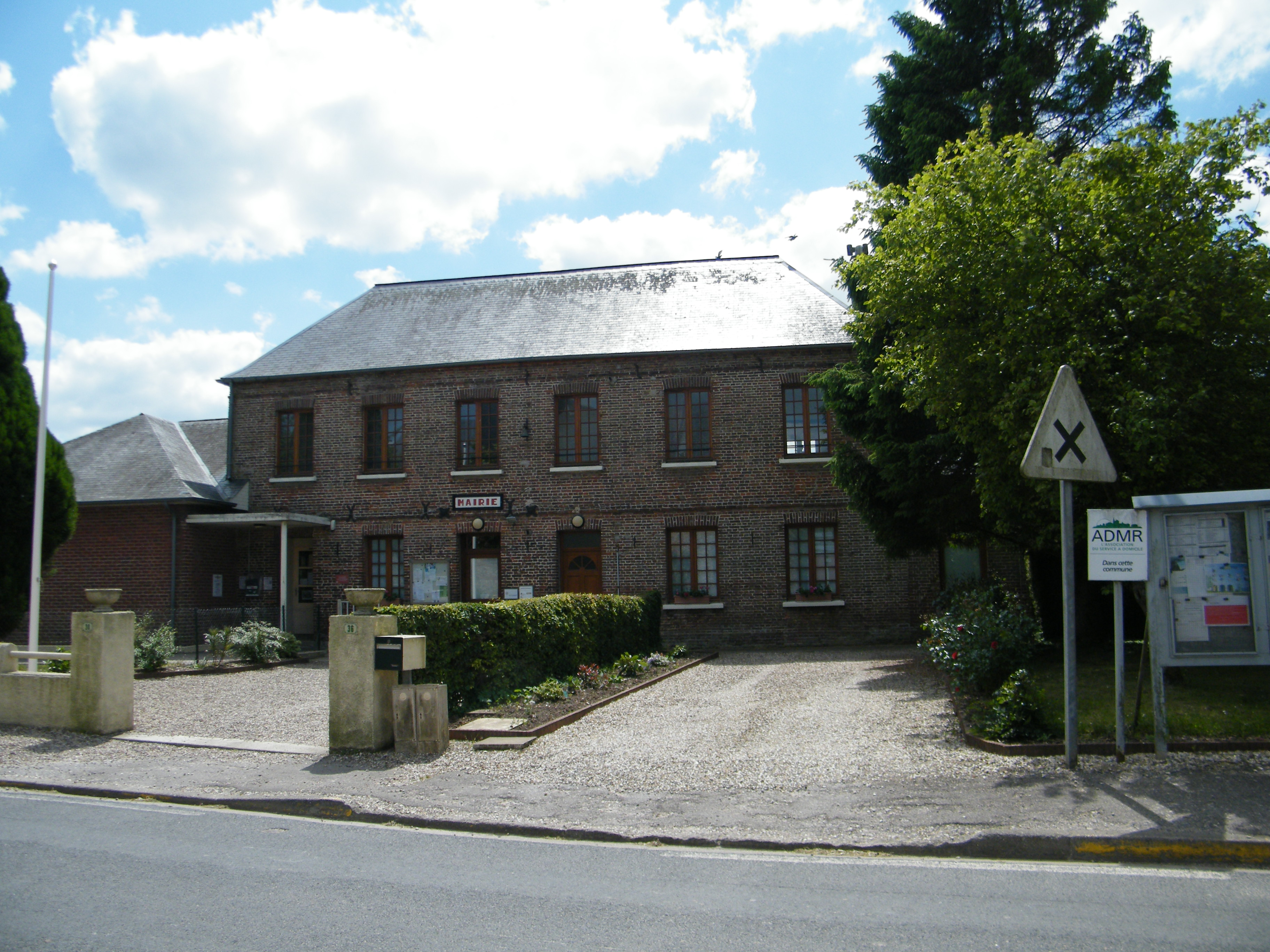
- The town hall in Millebosc

- Coat of arms
- Location of Millebosc
- Location within France Location within Normandy
- Coordinates: 49°58′30″N 1°29′28″E
- Country: France
- Region: Normandy
- Department: Seine-Maritime
- Arrondissement: Dieppe
- Canton: Eu
- Intercommunality: CC Villes Sœurs

Government
  - Mayor (2026–32): Christine Rodier
- Area^{1}: 7.91 km^{2} (3.05 sq mi)
- Elevation: 140 m (460 ft)
- Highest elevation: 159 m (522 ft)
- Lowest elevation: 49 m (161 ft)
- Population (2023): 242
  - Density: 30.6/km^{2} (79.2/sq mi)
- Time zone: UTC+01:00 (CET)
  - Summer (DST): UTC+02:00 (CEST)
- INSEE/Postal code: 76438 /76260
- ^{1} French Land Register data, which excludes lakes, ponds, glaciers > 1 km^{2} (0.386 sq mi or 247 acres) and river estuaries.

Millebosc is a commune in the Seine-Maritime department in the Normandy region in northern France.

== Geography ==
A forestry and farming village situated by the banks of the river Bresle in the middle of the forest of Eu, some 19 miles (31 km) east of Dieppe at the junction of the D126 and the D315 roads.

== Population ==
Historical population
Year	Pop.	±% p.a.
1968	248	—
1975	217	−1.89%
1982	214	−0.20%
1990	250	+1.96%
1999	244	−0.27%
2007	272	+1.37%
2012	266	−0.45%
2017	247	−1.47%
2023	242	−0.34%
Source: INSEE

== Places of interest ==
- The church of St. Wandrille, dating from the thirteenth century.

== See also ==
- Communes of the Seine-Maritime department
