= Dargnies =

- Commune
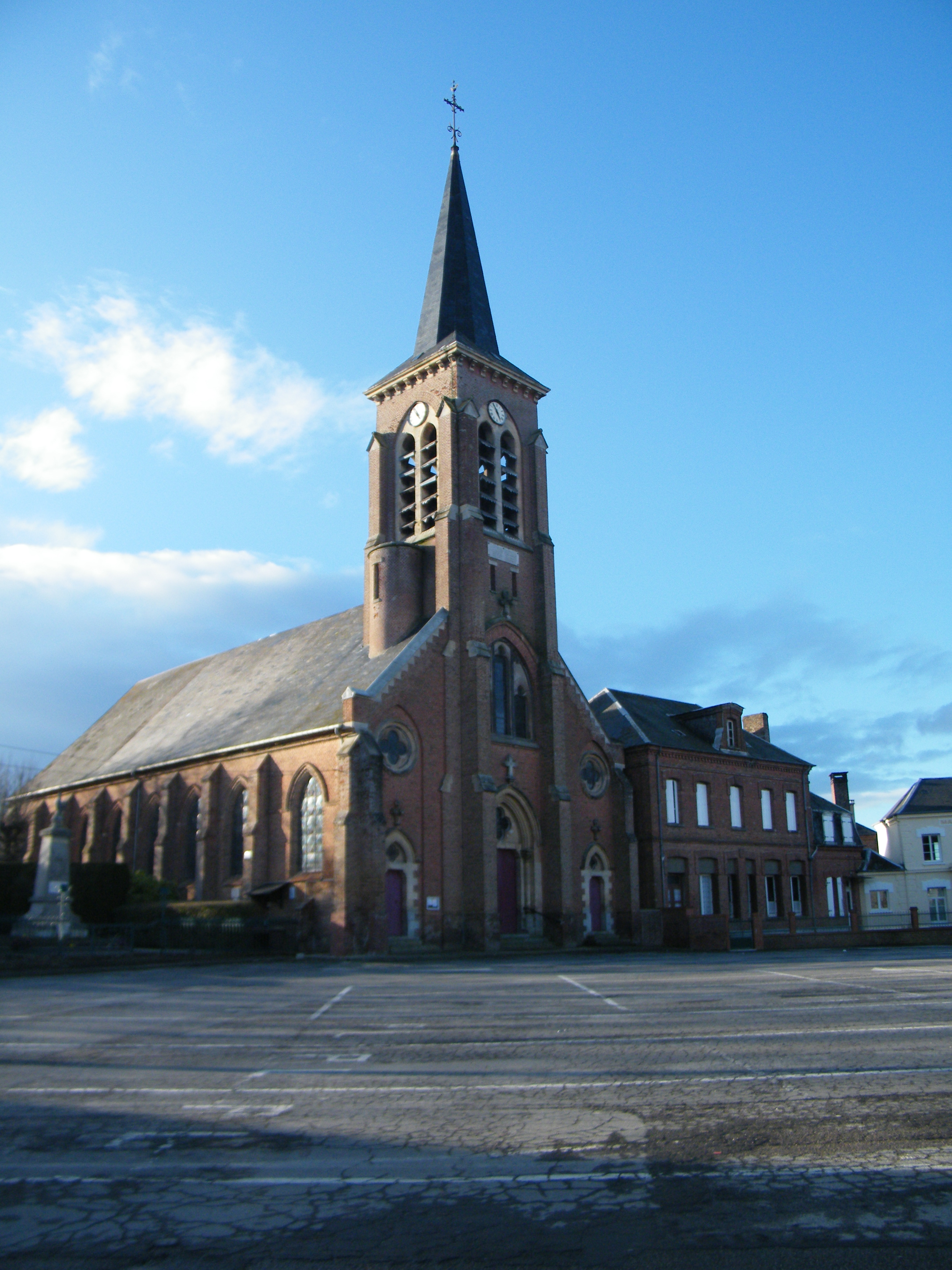
- The church in Dargnies
- Location of Dargnies
- Location within France Location within Hauts-de-France
- Coordinates: 50°02′33″N 1°31′34″E
- Country: France
- Region: Hauts-de-France
- Department: Somme
- Arrondissement: Abbeville
- Canton: Gamaches
- Intercommunality: CC Villes Sœurs

Government
  - Mayor (2020–2026): Benoît Ozenne
- Area^{1}: 3.67 km^{2} (1.42 sq mi)
- Elevation: 118 m (387 ft)
- Highest elevation: 129 m (423 ft)
- Lowest elevation: 81 m (266 ft)
- Population (2023): 1,174
  - Density: 320/km^{2} (829/sq mi)
- Time zone: UTC+01:00 (CET)
  - Summer (DST): UTC+02:00 (CEST)
- INSEE/Postal code: 80235 /80570
- ^{1} French Land Register data, which excludes lakes, ponds, glaciers > 1 km^{2} (0.386 sq mi or 247 acres) and river estuaries.

Dargnies (French pronunciation: [daʁɲi]; Picard: Dérgny) is a commune in the Somme department in Hauts-de-France in northern France.

== Geography ==
Dargnies is situated on the D2 and D19 road junction, high up in the valley of the Bresle, some 15 miles (24 km) southwest of Abbeville.

== Population ==
Historical population
Year	Pop.	±% p.a.
1968	1,347	—
1975	1,455	+1.11%
1982	1,388	−0.67%
1990	1,481	+0.81%
1999	1,443	−0.29%
2007	1,336	−0.96%
2012	1,311	−0.38%
2017	1,246	−1.01%
2023	1,174	−0.99%
Source: INSEE

== See also ==
- Communes of the Somme department
