= Ponts-et-Marais =

- Commune
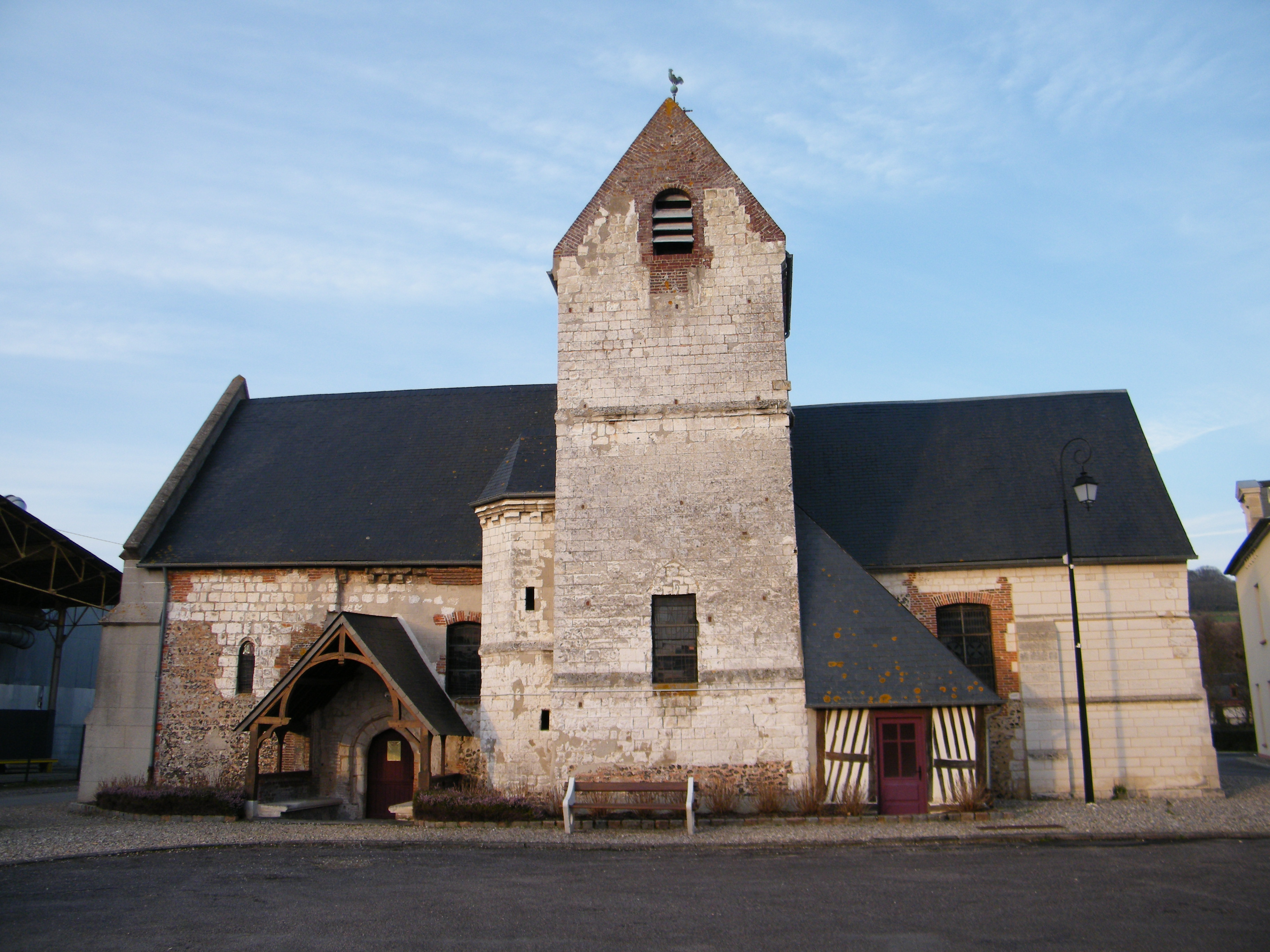
- The church in Ponts-et-Marais

- Coat of arms
- Location of Ponts-et-Marais
- Location within France Location within Normandy
- Coordinates: 50°02′40″N 1°26′47″E
- Country: France
- Region: Normandy
- Department: Seine-Maritime
- Arrondissement: Dieppe
- Canton: Eu
- Intercommunality: CC Villes Sœurs

Government
  - Mayor (2026–32): Marylise Bovin
- Area^{1}: 5.9 km^{2} (2.3 sq mi)
- Elevation: 9 m (30 ft)
- Highest elevation: 142 m (466 ft)
- Lowest elevation: 6 m (20 ft)
- Population (2023): 783
  - Density: 130/km^{2} (340/sq mi)
- Time zone: UTC+01:00 (CET)
  - Summer (DST): UTC+02:00 (CEST)
- INSEE/Postal code: 76507 /76260
- ^{1} French Land Register data, which excludes lakes, ponds, glaciers > 1 km^{2} (0.386 sq mi or 247 acres) and river estuaries.

Ponts-et-Marais (French pronunciation: [pɔ̃ e maʁɛ]) is a commune in the Seine-Maritime department in the Normandy region in northern France.

== Geography ==
A village of forestry, light industry and farming situated by the banks of the river Bresle in the Pays de Caux at the junction of the D49 and the D1015 roads, some 21 miles (34 km) northeast of Dieppe.

== Population ==
Historical population
Year	Pop.	±% p.a.
1968	791	—
1975	773	−0.33%
1982	854	+1.43%
1990	793	−0.92%
1999	828	+0.48%
2007	840	+0.18%
2012	800	−0.97%
2017	799	−0.03%
2023	783	−0.34%
Source: INSEE

== Places of interest ==
- The church of St. Valery, dating from the twelfth century.

== See also ==
- Communes of the Seine-Maritime department
