= Le Mesnil-Réaume =

- Commune
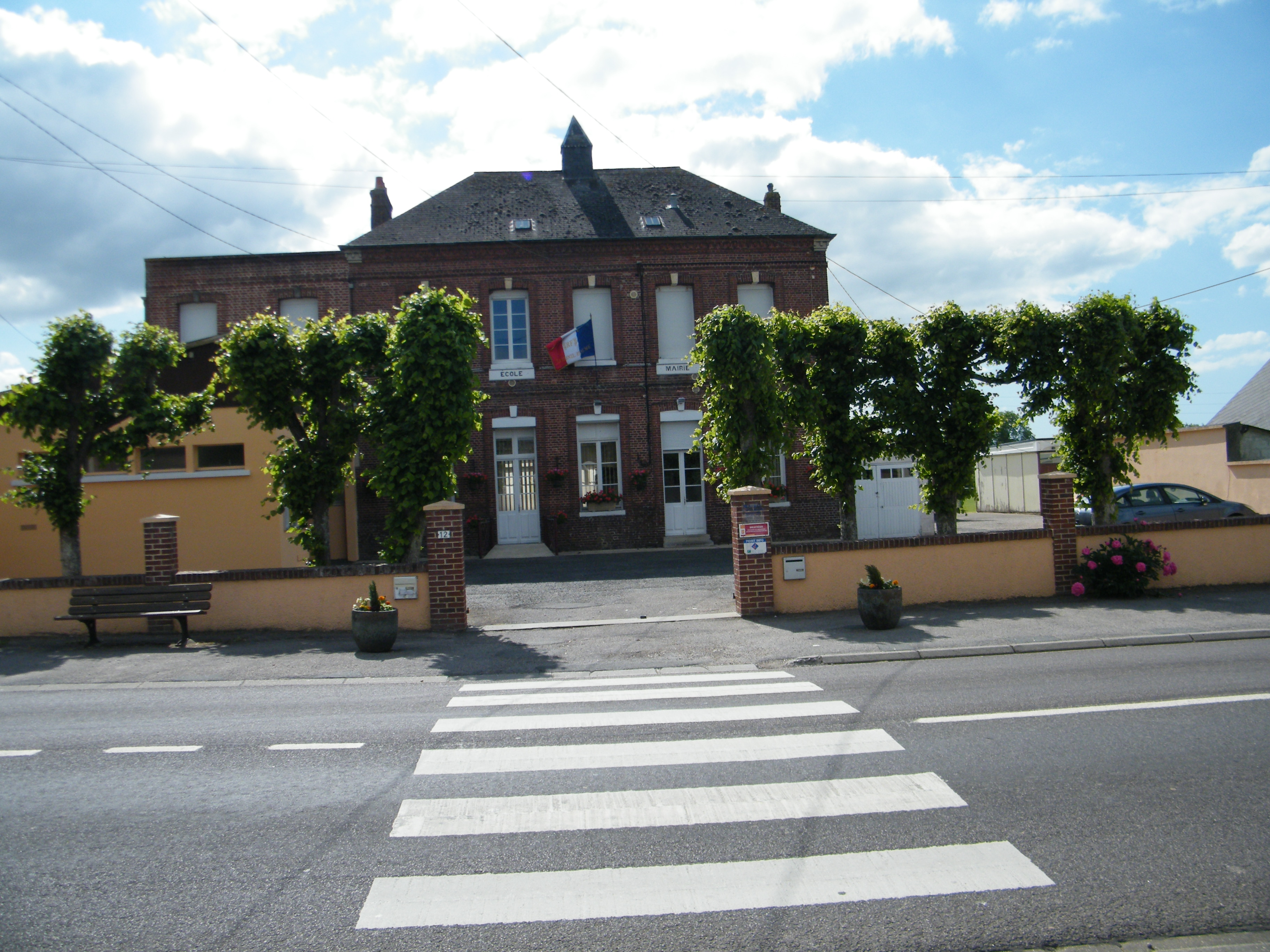
- The town hall in Le Mesnil-Réaume

- Coat of arms
- Location of Le Mesnil-Réaume
- Location within France Location within Normandy
- Coordinates: 49°58′21″N 1°26′47″E
- Country: France
- Region: Normandy
- Department: Seine-Maritime
- Arrondissement: Dieppe
- Canton: Eu
- Intercommunality: CC Villes Sœurs

Government
  - Mayor (2026–32): Bruno Saintyves
- Area^{1}: 5.55 km^{2} (2.14 sq mi)
- Elevation: 140 m (460 ft)
- Highest elevation: 156 m (512 ft)
- Lowest elevation: 92 m (302 ft)
- Population (2023): 808
  - Density: 146/km^{2} (377/sq mi)
- Time zone: UTC+01:00 (CET)
  - Summer (DST): UTC+02:00 (CEST)
- INSEE/Postal code: 76435 /76260
- ^{1} French Land Register data, which excludes lakes, ponds, glaciers > 1 km^{2} (0.386 sq mi or 247 acres) and river estuaries.

Le Mesnil-Réaume is a commune in the Seine-Maritime department in the Normandy region in northern France.

== Geography ==
A farming and forestry village situated in the Pays de Caux, some 15 miles (24 km) northeast of Dieppe at the junction of the D78, D58 and the D1314 roads.

== Heraldry ==
| Arms of Le Mesnil-Réaume | The arms of Le Mesnil-Réaume are blazoned : Quarterly 1&4: Vair, a bordure gules; 2&3: Or, a leopard gules. |

== Population ==
Historical population
| Year | Pop. | ±% p.a. |
|---|---|---|
| 1968 | 250 | — |
| 1975 | 435 | +8.23% |
| 1982 | 461 | +0.83% |
| 1990 | 464 | +0.08% |
| 1999 | 439 | −0.61% |
| 2007 | 502 | +1.69% |
| 2012 | 670 | +5.94% |
| 2017 | 793 | +3.43% |
| 2023 | 808 | +0.31% |
Source: INSEE

== Places of interest ==
- The church of St.Pierre, dating from the sixteenth century.

== See also ==
- Communes of the Seine-Maritime department
