= Baromesnil =

- Commune
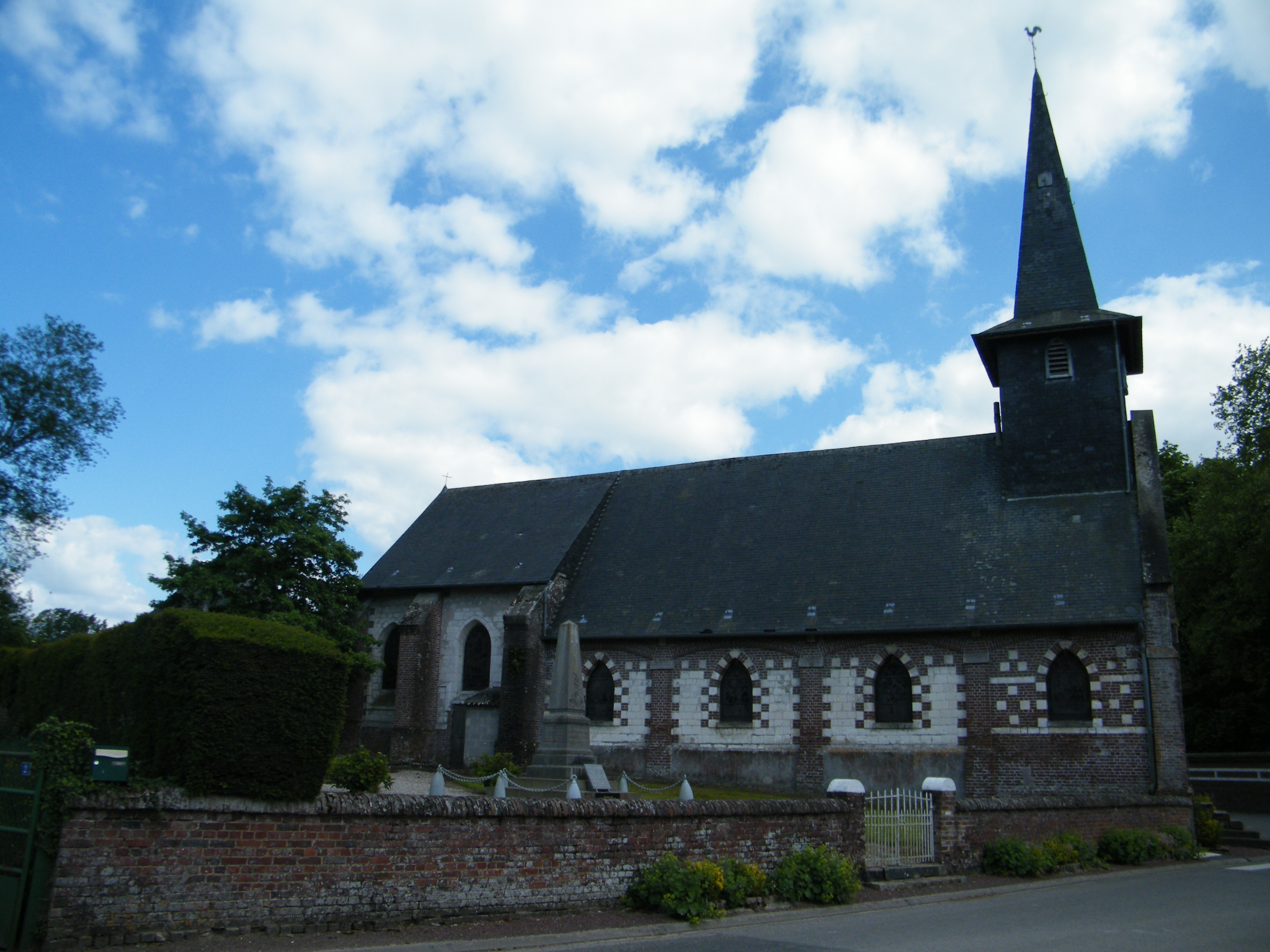
- The church in Baromesnil
- Location of Baromesnil
- Location within France Location within Normandy
- Coordinates: 49°59′15″N 1°24′43″E
- Country: France
- Region: Normandy
- Department: Seine-Maritime
- Arrondissement: Dieppe
- Canton: Eu
- Intercommunality: CC Villes Sœurs

Government
  - Mayor (2026–32): Jérôme Blondel
- Area^{1}: 7.98 km^{2} (3.08 sq mi)
- Elevation: 124 m (407 ft)
- Highest elevation: 140 m (460 ft)
- Lowest elevation: 74 m (243 ft)
- Population (2023): 218
  - Density: 27.3/km^{2} (70.8/sq mi)
- Time zone: UTC+01:00 (CET)
  - Summer (DST): UTC+02:00 (CEST)
- INSEE/Postal code: 76058 /76260
- ^{1} French Land Register data, which excludes lakes, ponds, glaciers > 1 km^{2} (0.386 sq mi or 247 acres) and river estuaries.

Baromesnil (French pronunciation: [baʁɔmenil]) is a commune in the Seine-Maritime department in the Normandy region in northern France.

== Geography ==
A forestry and farming village in the valley of the Yères river, in the Pays de Caux, situated some 15 miles (24 km) east of Dieppe, at the junction of the D258 and D78 roads.

== Population ==
Historical population
| Year | Pop. | ±% p.a. |
|---|---|---|
| 1968 | 251 | — |
| 1975 | 262 | +0.61% |
| 1982 | 299 | +1.91% |
| 1990 | 266 | −1.45% |
| 1999 | 259 | −0.30% |
| 2007 | 246 | −0.64% |
| 2012 | 244 | −0.16% |
| 2017 | 228 | −1.35% |
| 2023 | 218 | −0.74% |
Source: INSEE

== Places of interest ==
- The church of Notre-Dame, dating from the sixteenth century.

== See also ==
- Communes of the Seine-Maritime department
