= Embreville =

- Commune
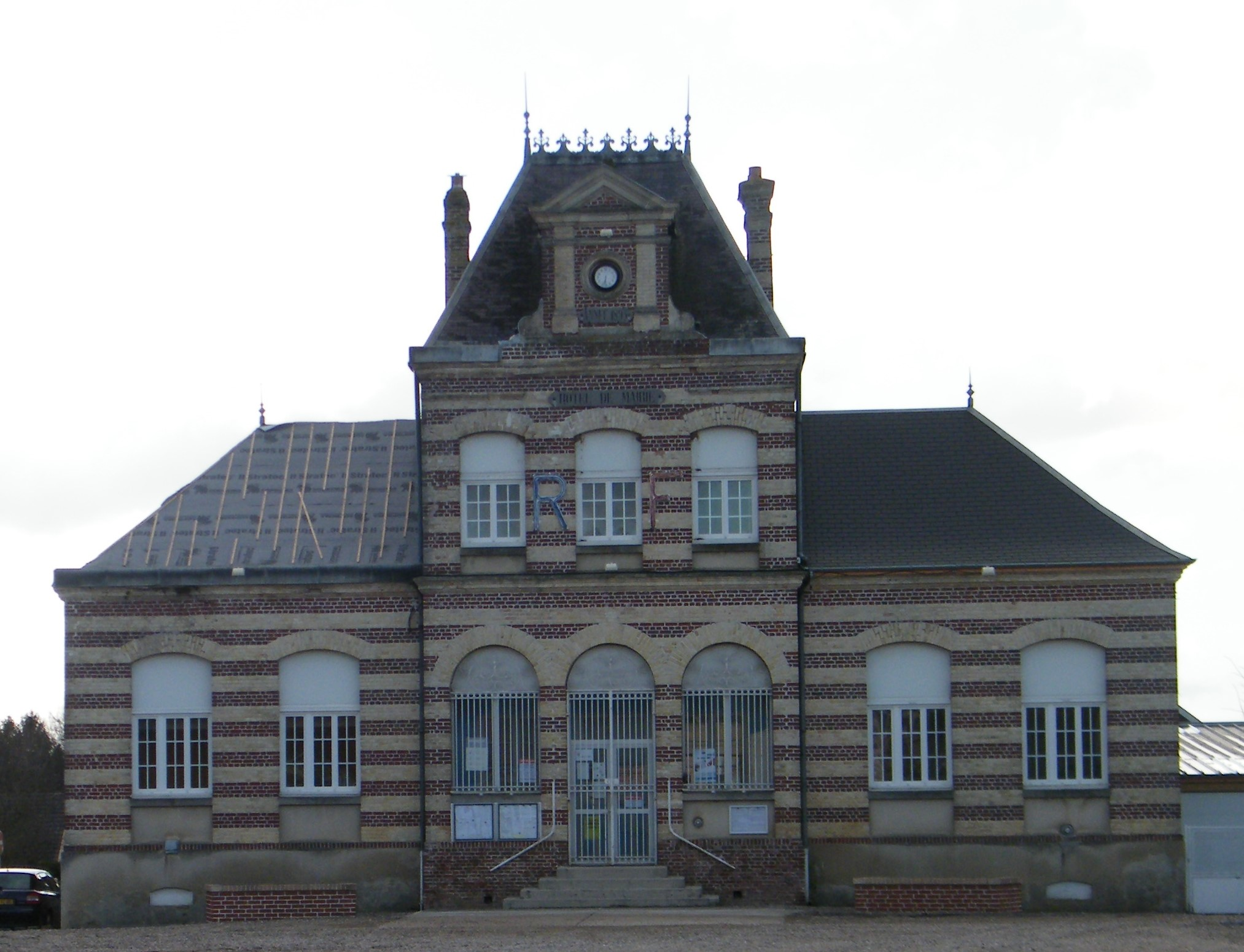
- Embreville Town hall

- Coat of arms
- Location of Embreville
- Location within France Location within Hauts-de-France
- Coordinates: 50°01′59″N 1°33′00″E
- Country: France
- Region: Hauts-de-France
- Department: Somme
- Arrondissement: Abbeville
- Canton: Gamaches
- Intercommunality: CC Villes Sœurs

Government
  - Mayor (2020–2026): Daniel Cave
- Area^{1}: 5.33 km^{2} (2.06 sq mi)
- Elevation: 117 m (384 ft)
- Highest elevation: 119 m (390 ft)
- Lowest elevation: 65 m (213 ft)
- Population (2023): 560
  - Density: 110/km^{2} (270/sq mi)
- Time zone: UTC+01:00 (CET)
  - Summer (DST): UTC+02:00 (CEST)
- INSEE/Postal code: 80265 /80570
- ^{1} French Land Register data, which excludes lakes, ponds, glaciers > 1 km^{2} (0.386 sq mi or 247 acres) and river estuaries.

Embreville (French pronunciation: [ɑ̃bʁəvil]; Picard: Imbreuville ) is a commune in the Somme department in Hauts-de-France in northern France.

== Geography ==
Embreville is situated 14 miles (23 km) southwest of Abbeville on the D190, a couple of miles from the river Somme.

== Population ==
Historical population
Year	Pop.	±% p.a.
1968	488	—
1975	540	+1.46%
1982	503	−1.01%
1990	549	+1.10%
1999	576	+0.53%
2007	580	+0.09%
2012	579	−0.03%
2017	557	−0.77%
2023	560	+0.09%
Source: INSEE

== See also ==
- Communes of the Somme department
