= Ault, Somme =

Ault
- Commune
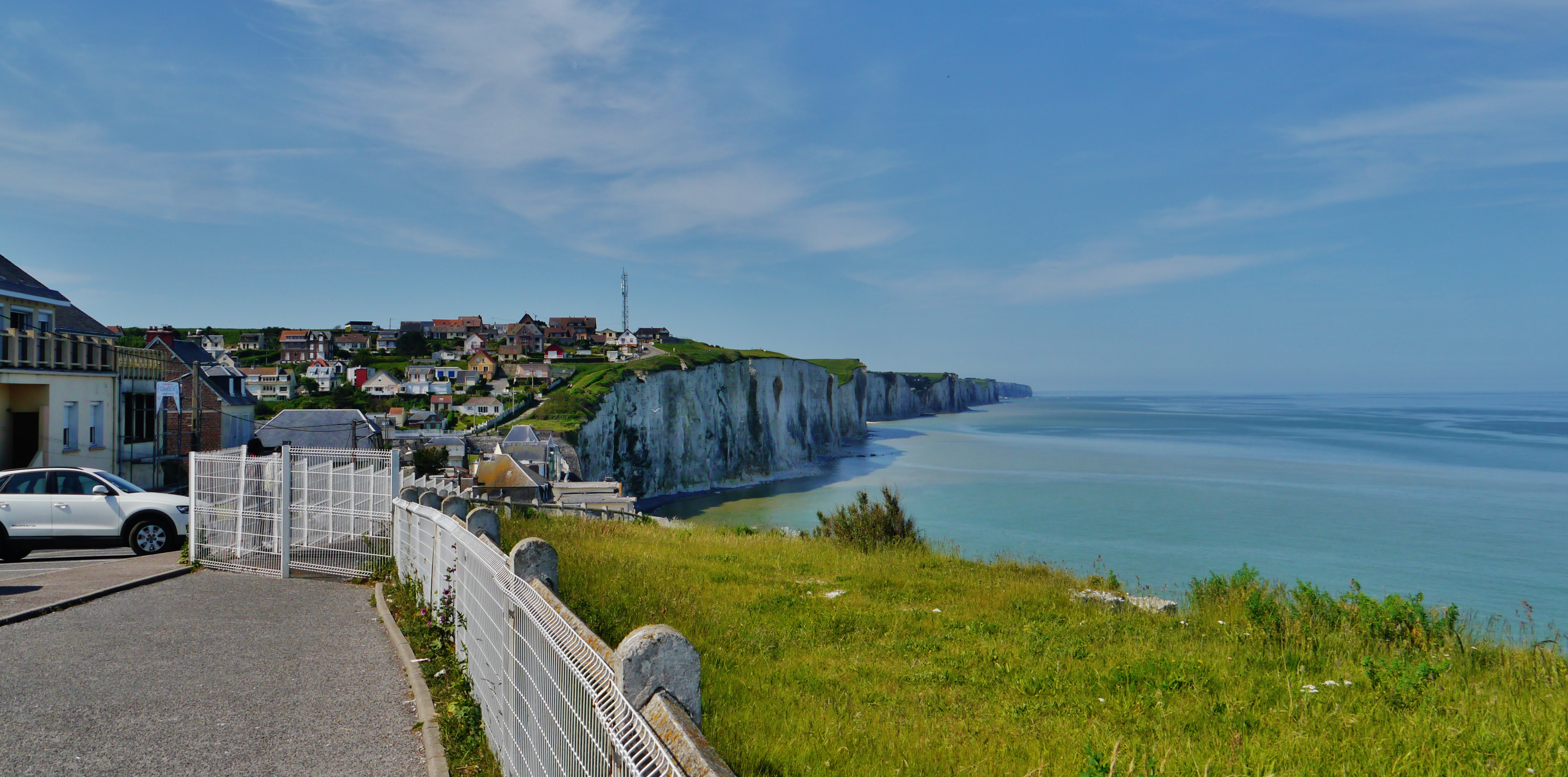
- The view of Ault

- Coat of arms
- Location of Ault
- Location within France Location within Hauts-de-France
- Coordinates: 50°06′07″N 1°26′58″E
- Country: France
- Region: Hauts-de-France
- Department: Somme
- Arrondissement: Abbeville
- Canton: Friville-Escarbotin
- Intercommunality: CC Villes Sœurs

Government
  - Mayor (2020–2026): Marcel Le Moigne
- Area^{1}: 5.99 km^{2} (2.31 sq mi)
- Elevation: 86 m (282 ft)
- Highest elevation: 107 m (351 ft)
- Lowest elevation: 0 m (0 ft)
- Population (2023): 1,346
  - Density: 225/km^{2} (582/sq mi)
- Time zone: UTC+01:00 (CET)
  - Summer (DST): UTC+02:00 (CEST)
- INSEE/Postal code: 80039 /80460
- ^{1} French Land Register data, which excludes lakes, ponds, glaciers > 1 km^{2} (0.386 sq mi or 247 acres) and river estuaries.

Ault (French pronunciation: [olt]; Picard: Eut) is a commune in the Somme department in Hauts-de-France in northern France.

== Geography ==
Situated on the English Channel, on the D19 road, 20 miles (32 km) west of Abbeville, in the southwest of the department, Ault possesses chalk cliffs overlooking a beach of pebbles (and sand at low tide). To the south of the town is a large wooded area, the ‘Bois de Cise’, in a valley that leads on to the coast. To the north, the cliffs descend to the level of the beach at Onival. The area around the town, the 'hâble d’Ault' was mostly tidal marshland that has been reclaimed from the sea. Cattle, sheep and game are raised here.

== Railways ==
Ault had a station on the standard gauge Woincourt to Onival line, which closed to passengers in May 1939, but saw much use during World War II to move materials for the Atlantic Wall. During the war, a metre gauge line was laid alongside the road from Lanchères, on the CFBS, to Ault. This line was dismantled after the war.

== Population ==
Historical population
Year	Pop.	±% p.a.
1968	2,014	—
1975	2,192	+1.22%
1982	2,058	−0.90%
1990	2,054	−0.02%
1999	2,070	+0.09%
2007	1,846	−1.42%
2012	1,629	−2.47%
2017	1,464	−2.11%
2023	1,346	−1.39%
Source: INSEE

== Places of interest ==
- The 15th / sixteenth century church of Saint-Pierre,
- The war memorial, designed by Paul Landowski.
- Two chapels, at Onival and Bois de Cise dating from the nineteenth century.
- Several ancient village houses.
- The lighthouse, with its lantern over 106 metres above sea-level.
- The cliffs
- The beaches of Ault and Bois de Cise..
- The ‘hâble d'Ault', with signed pathways.

== Sea defences ==
The town has paid a heavy price defending itself against the sea, which is constantly washing away the beach, cliffs and public spaces, such as the car parks and gardens. The problem is ongoing. A "balcony on the sea", a huge concrete construction has been built but the risks remain. Signs of wear of the dyke under the casino have been noted.

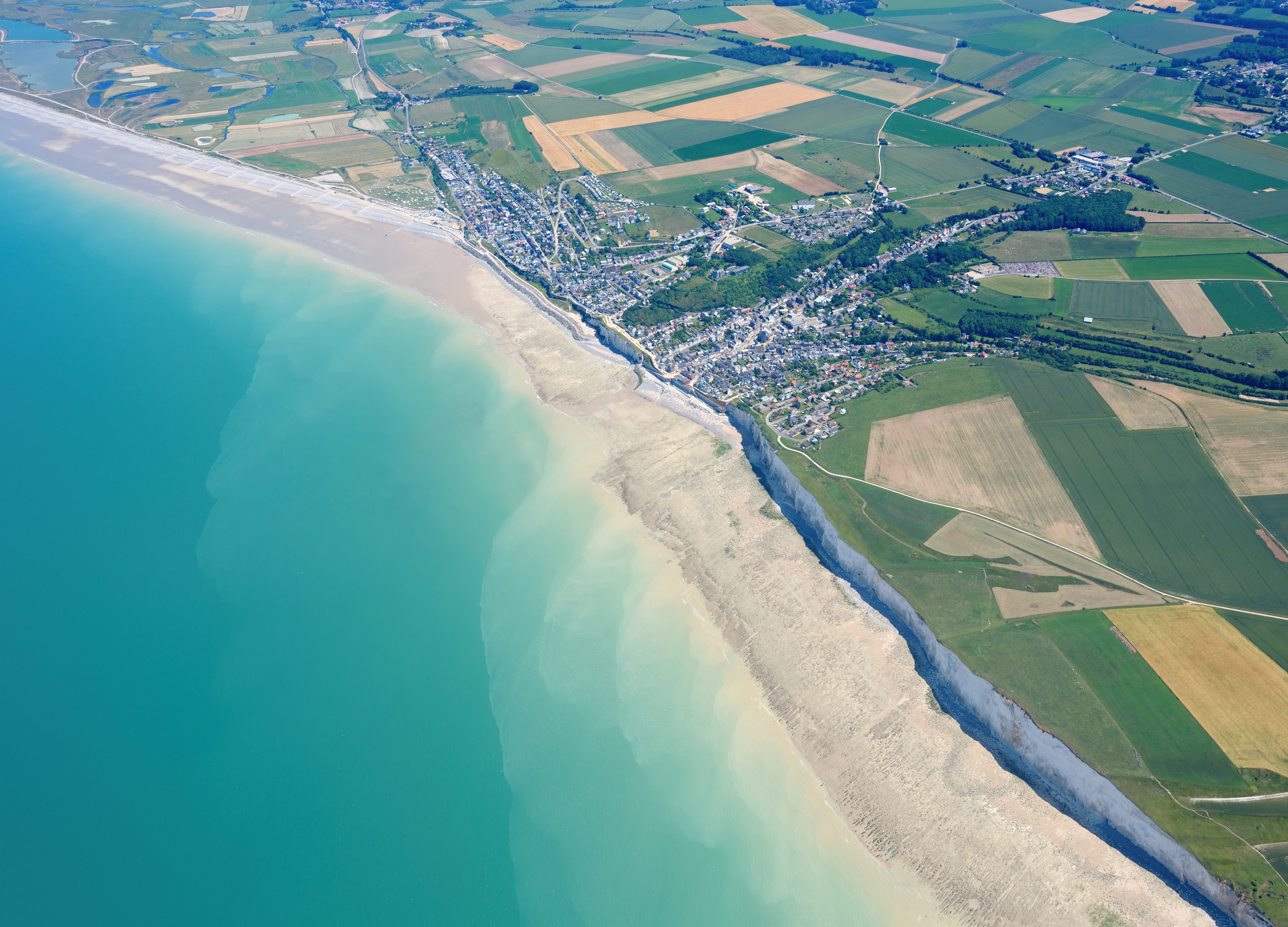
Aerial view of Ault and its cliffs

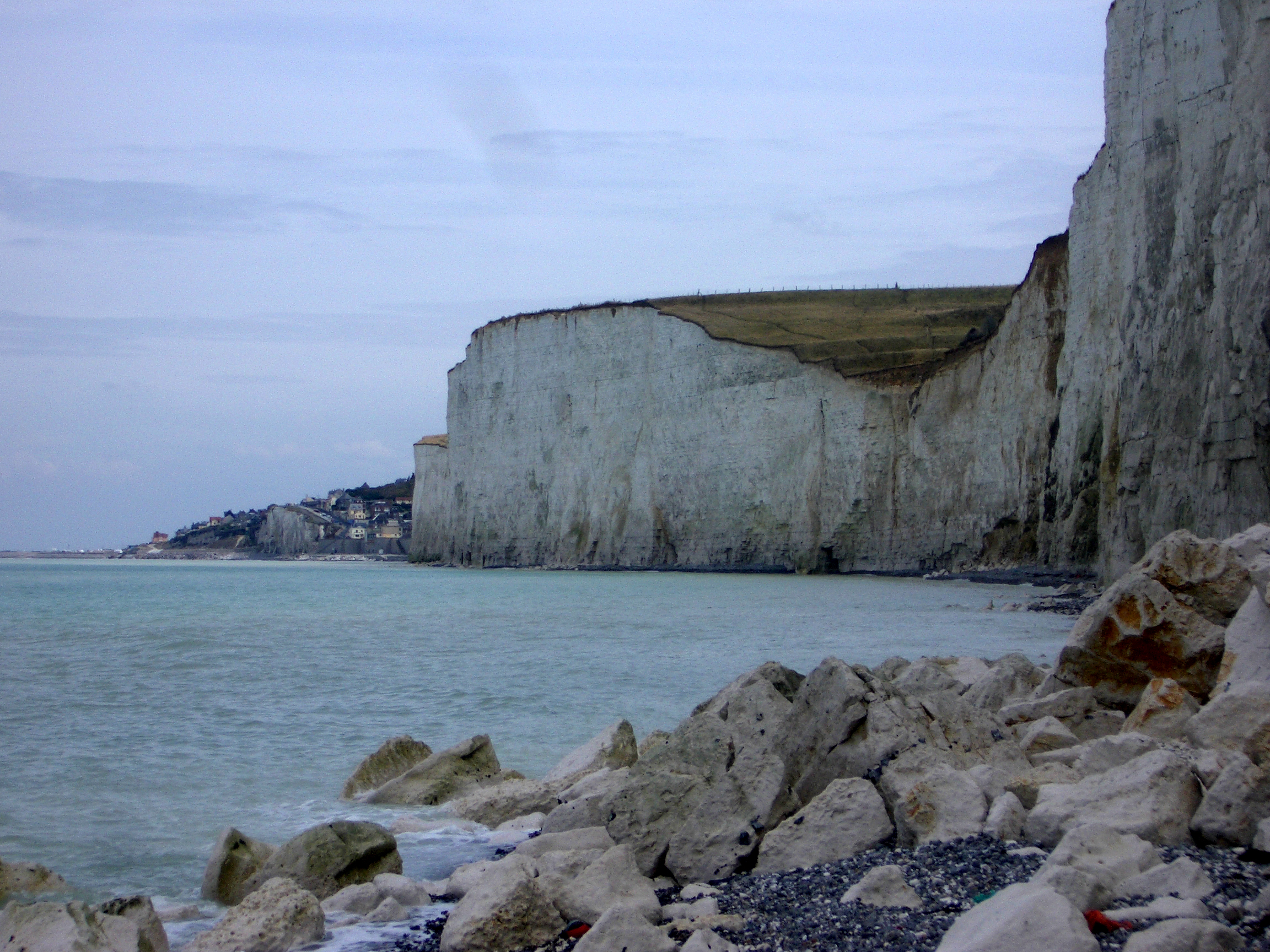
The cliffs

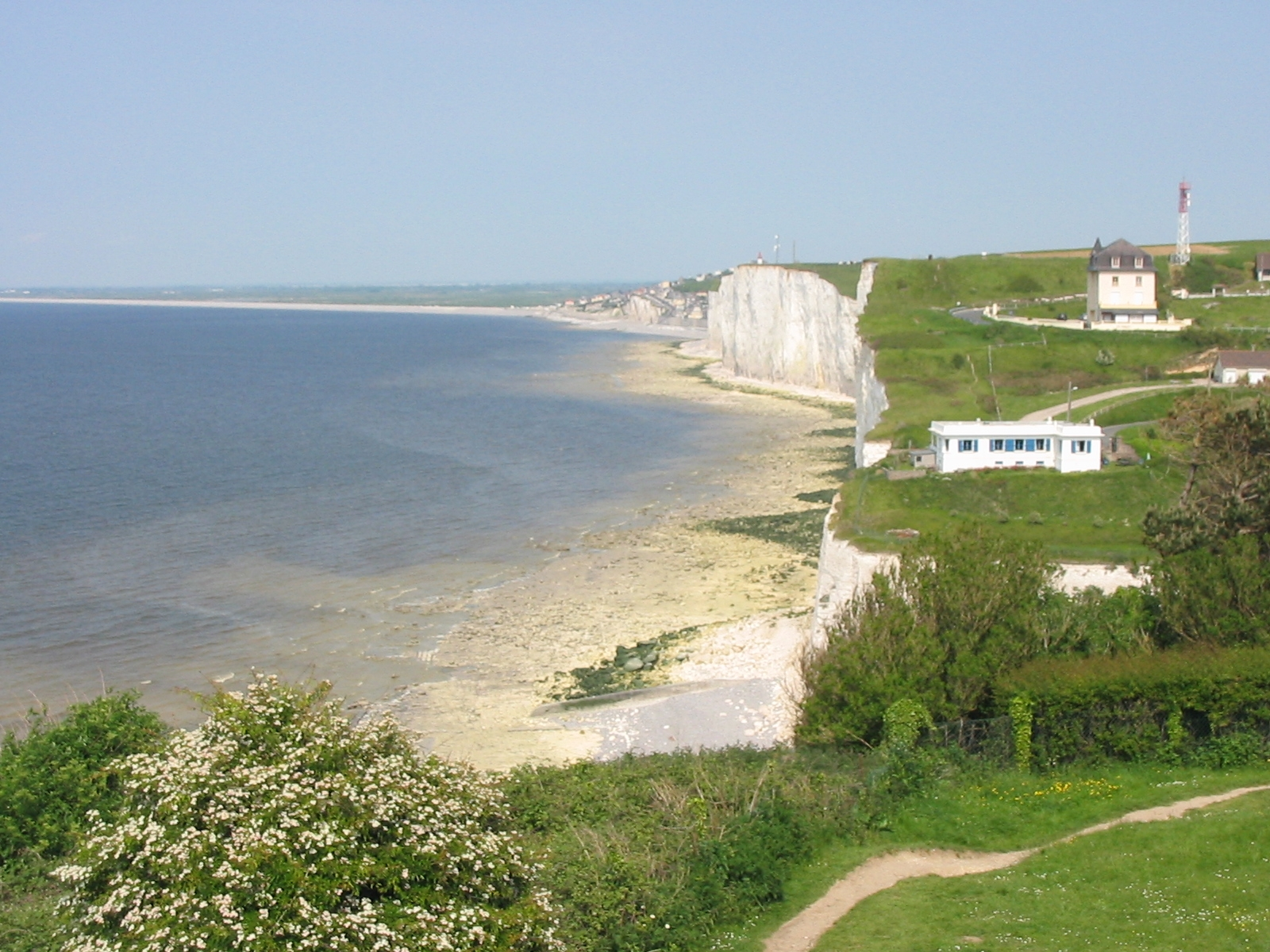
Bois de Cise and cliffs

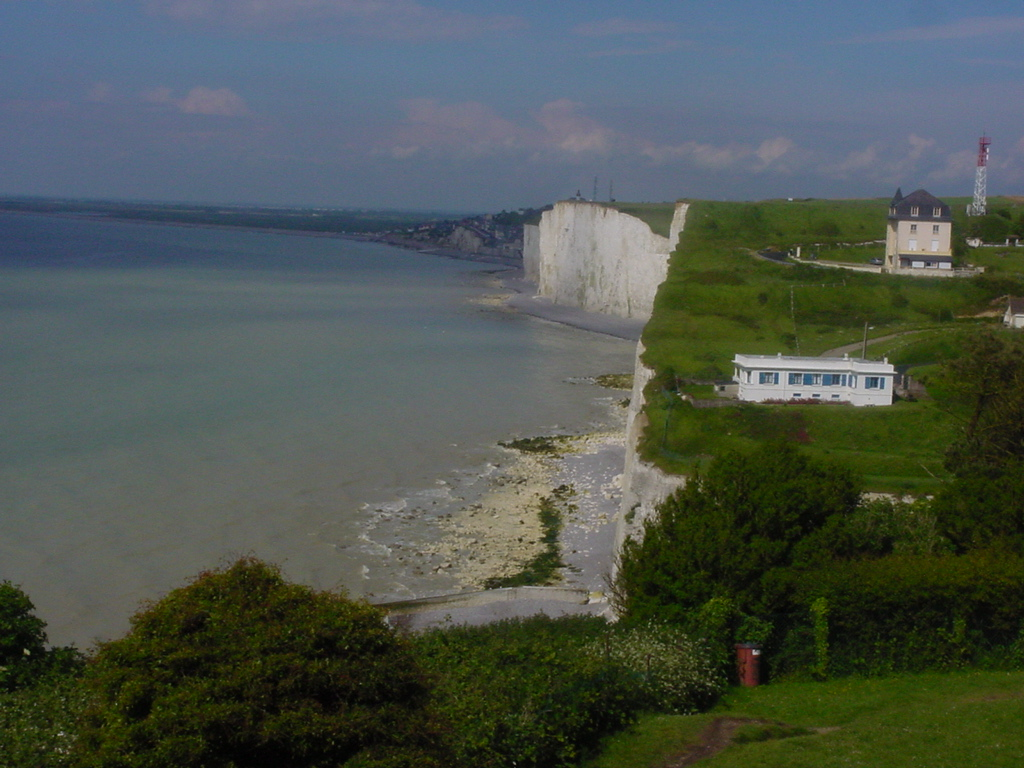

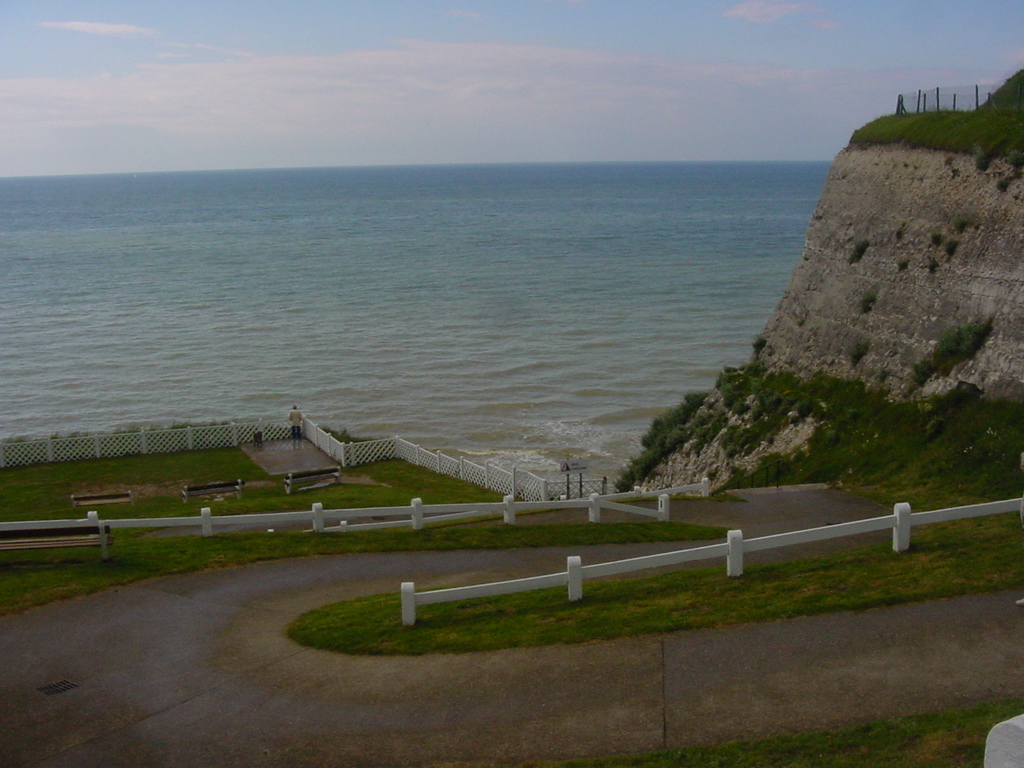

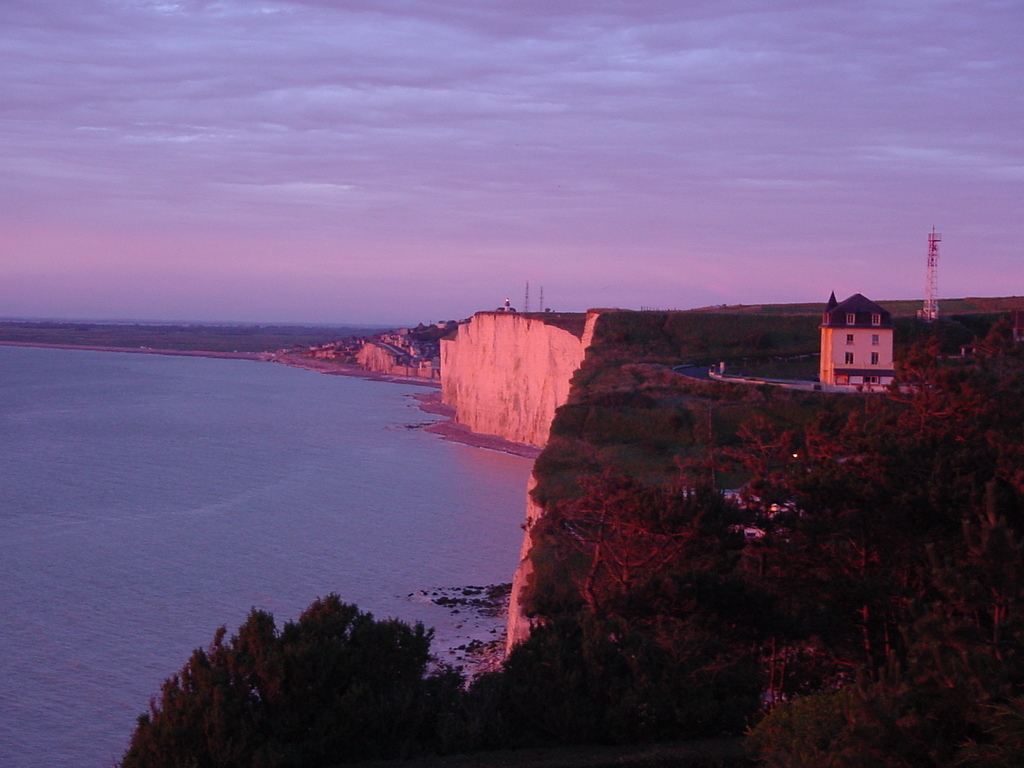

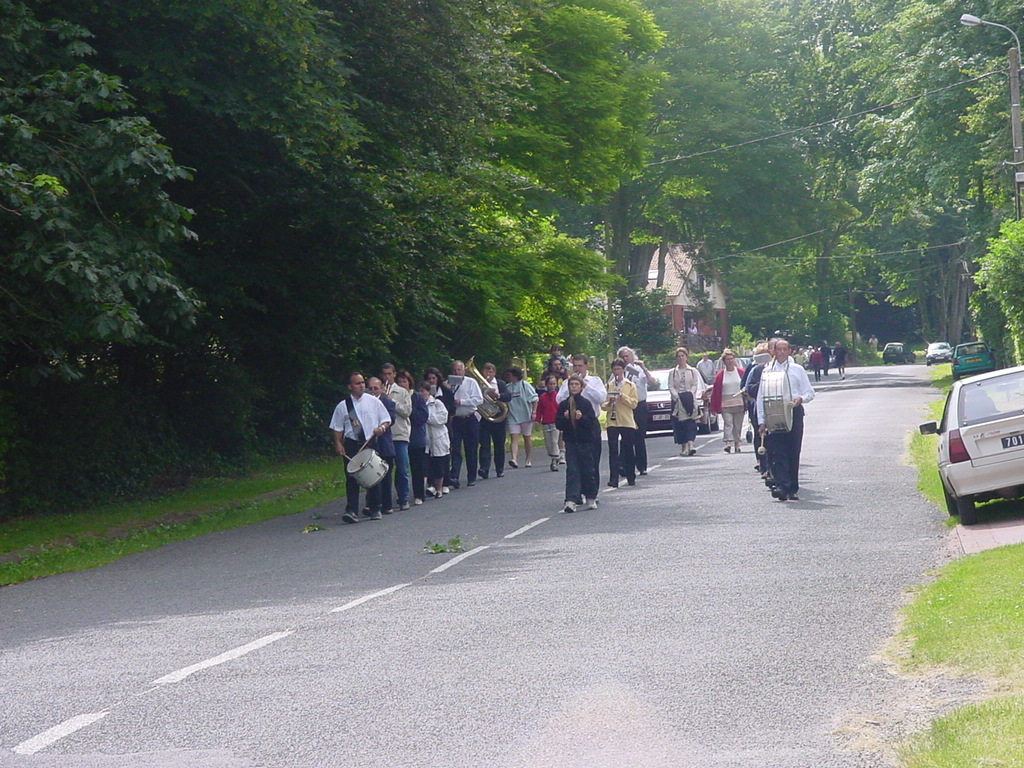

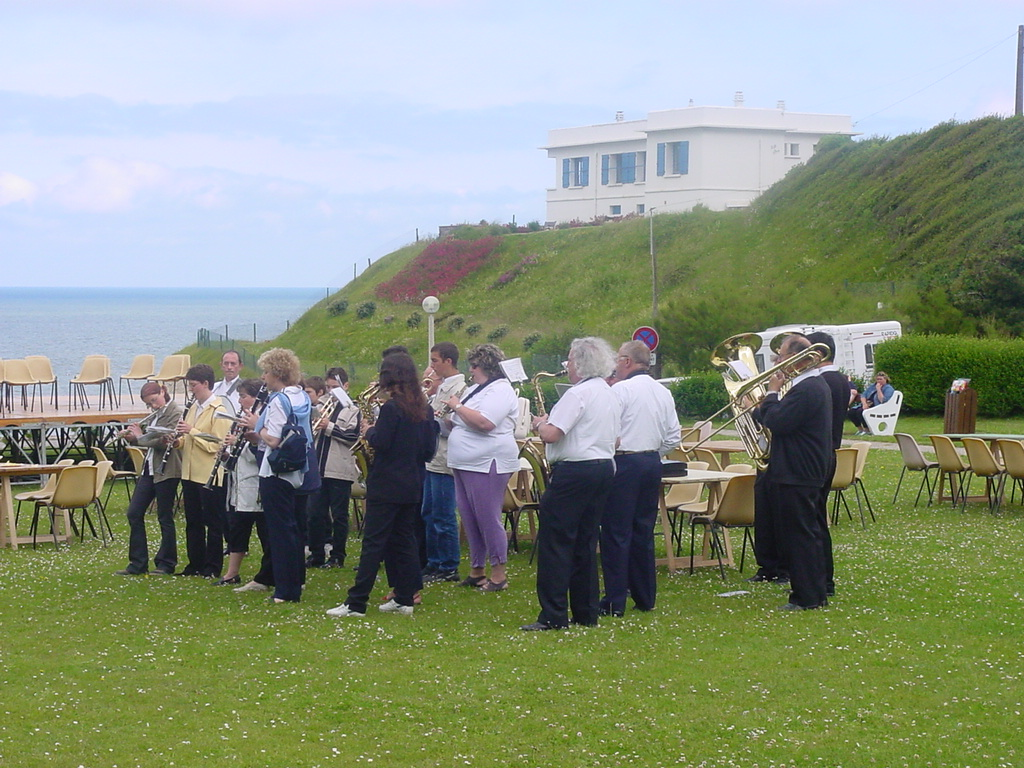

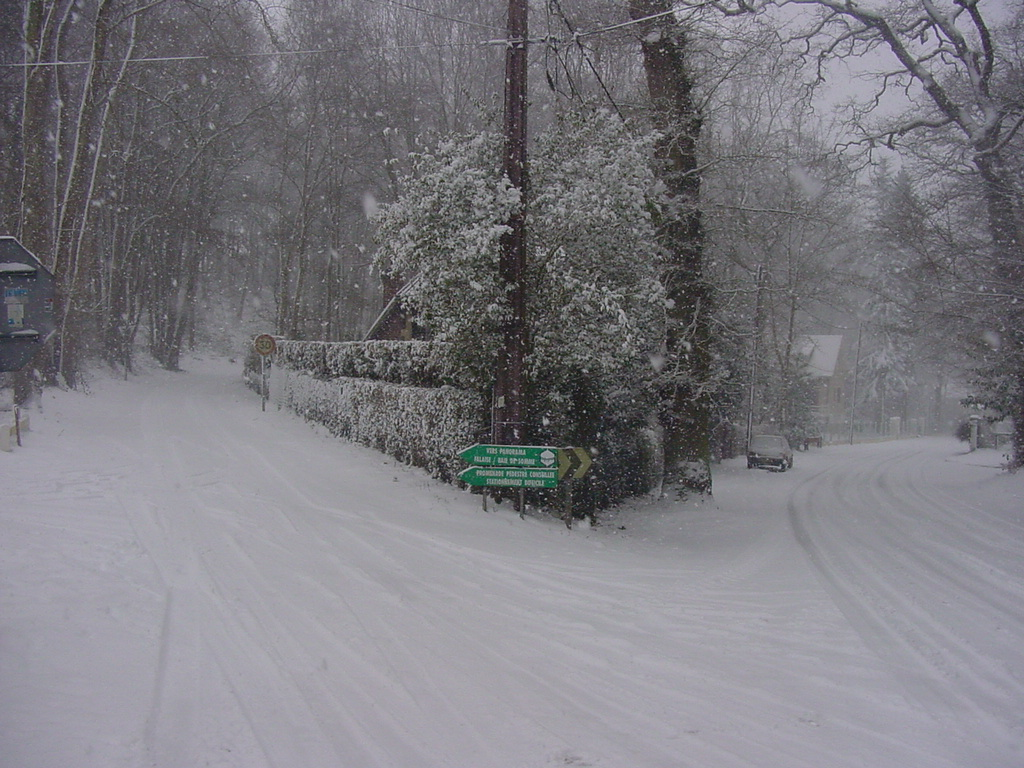

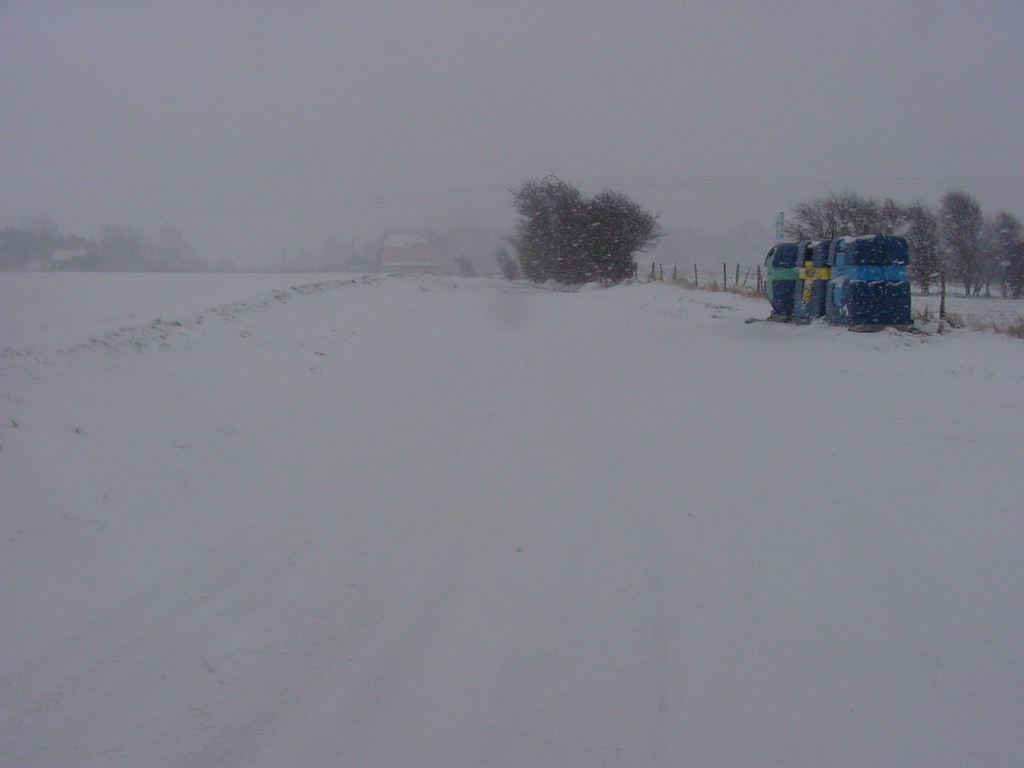

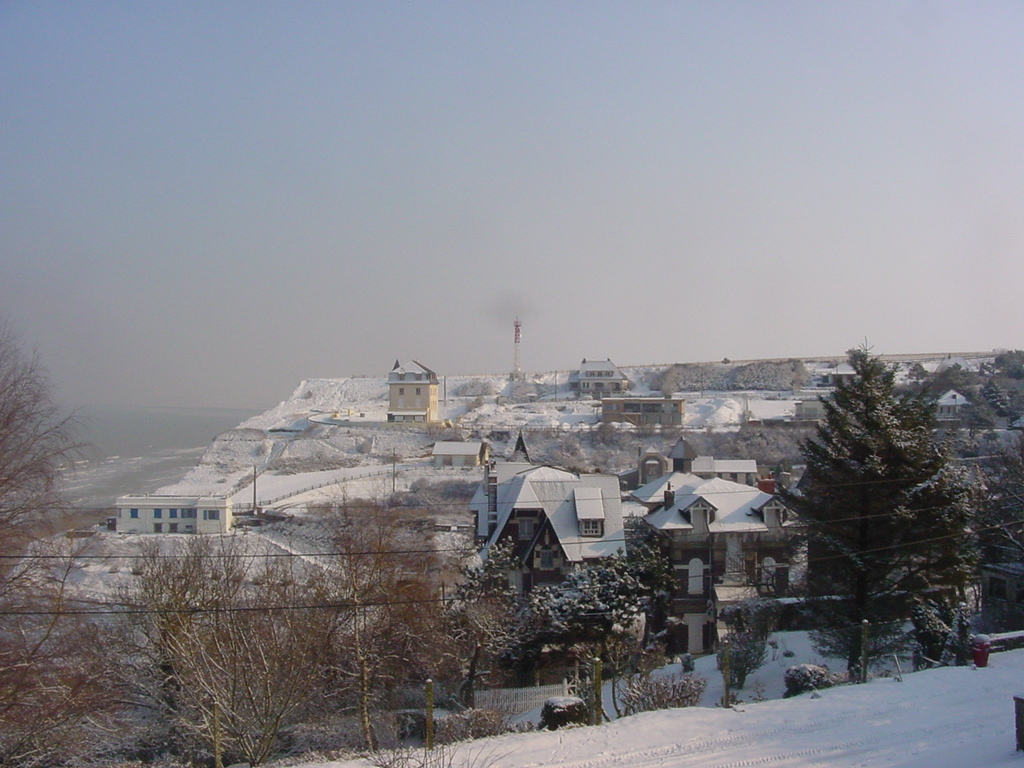

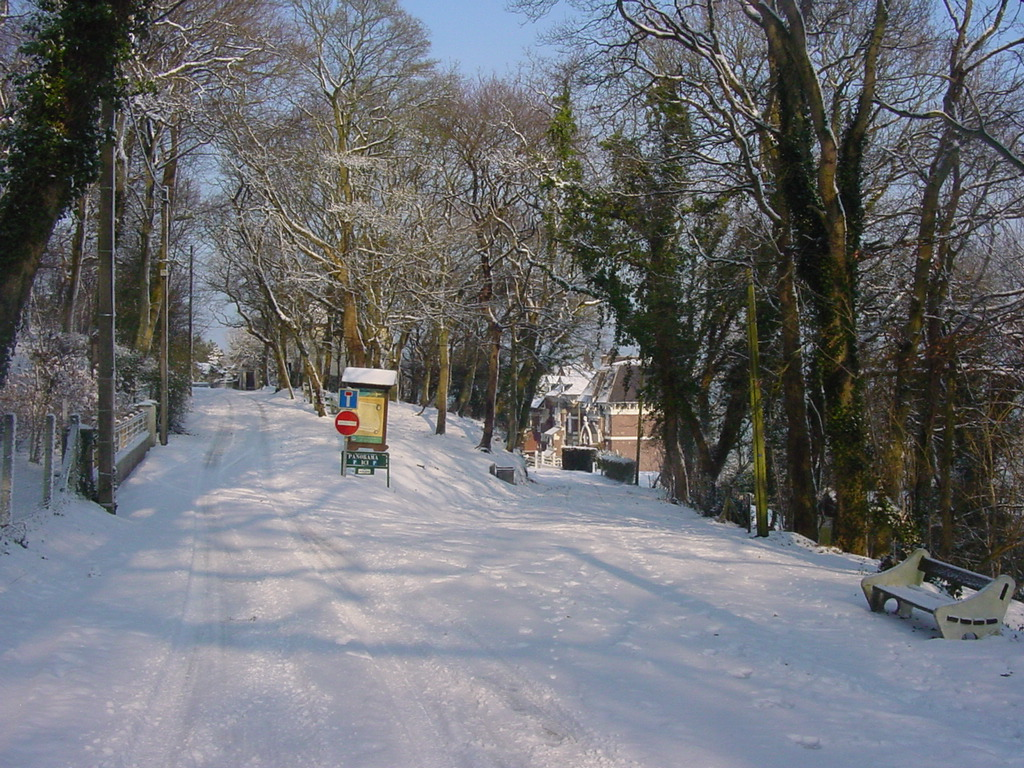

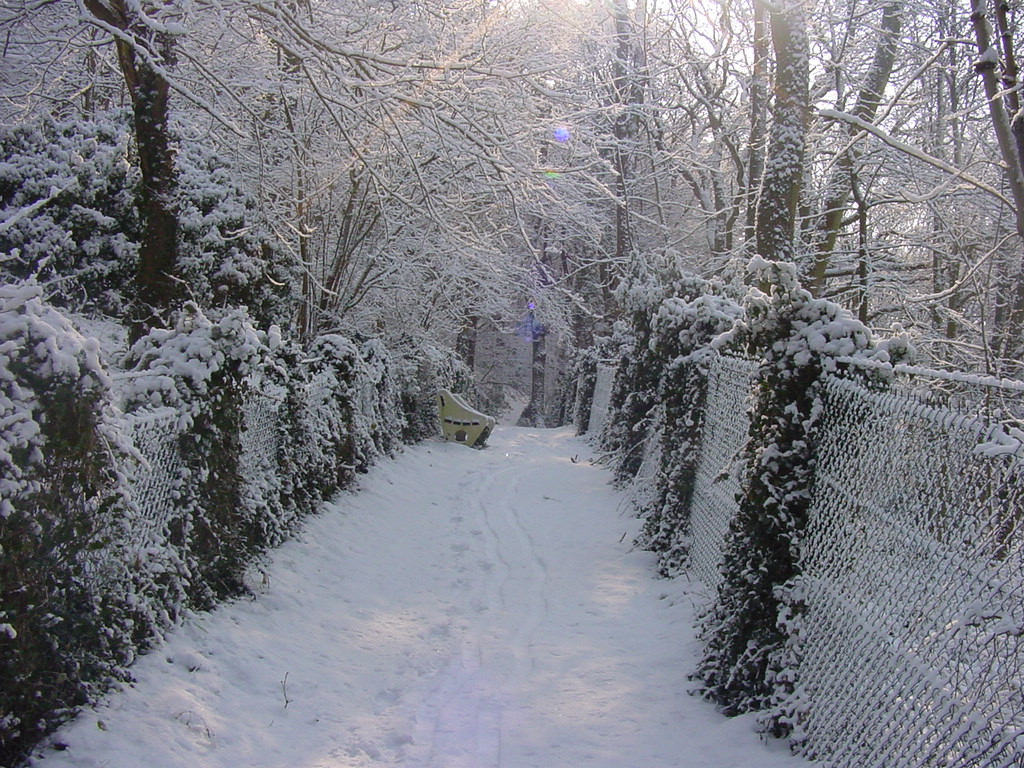

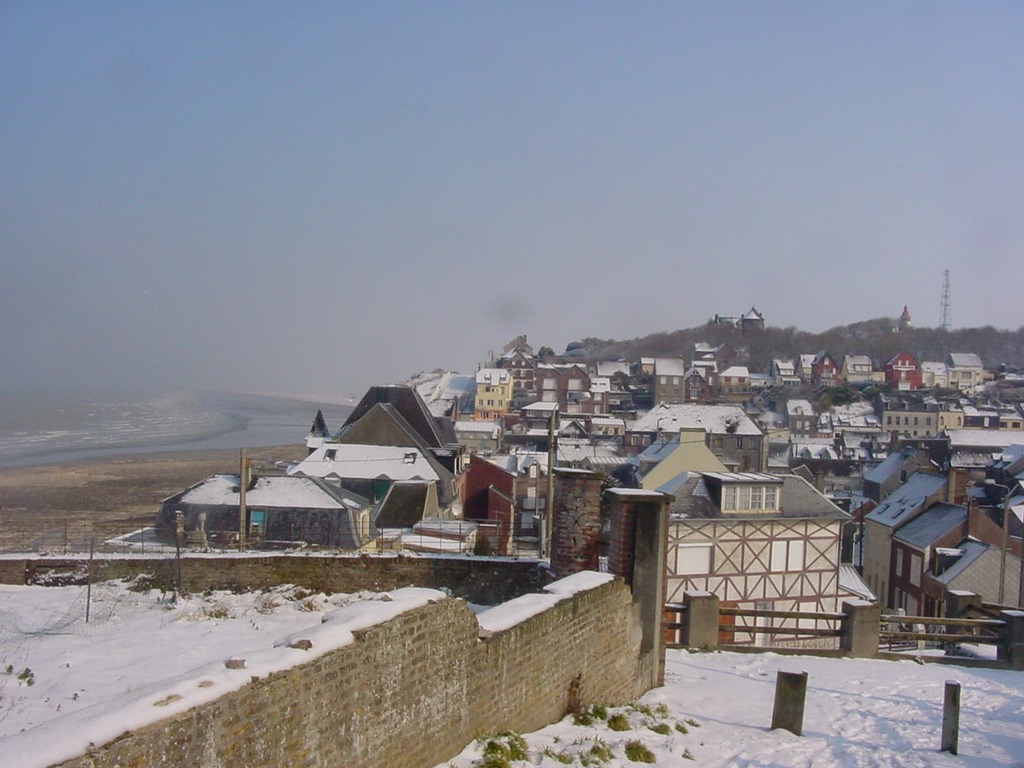

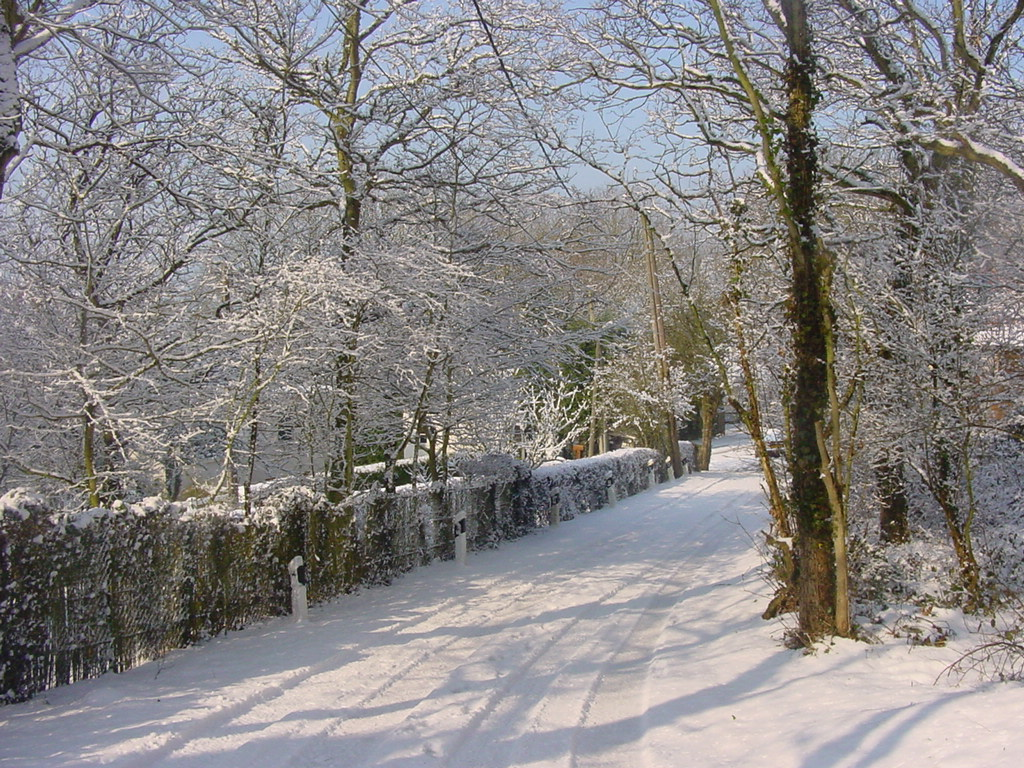

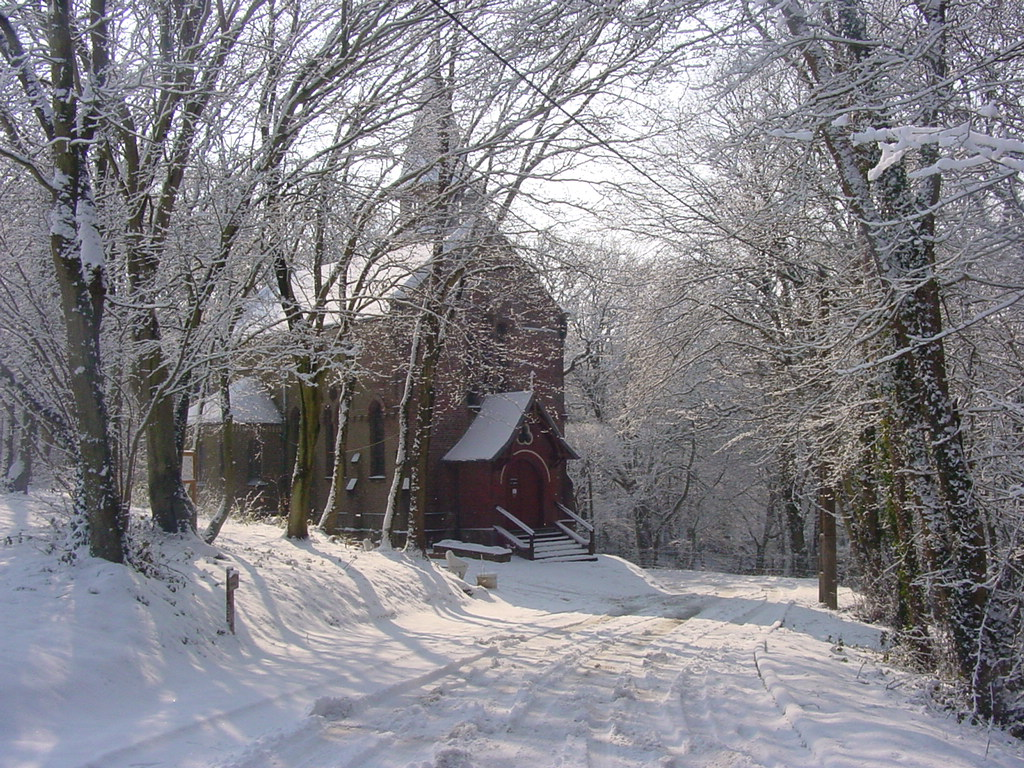

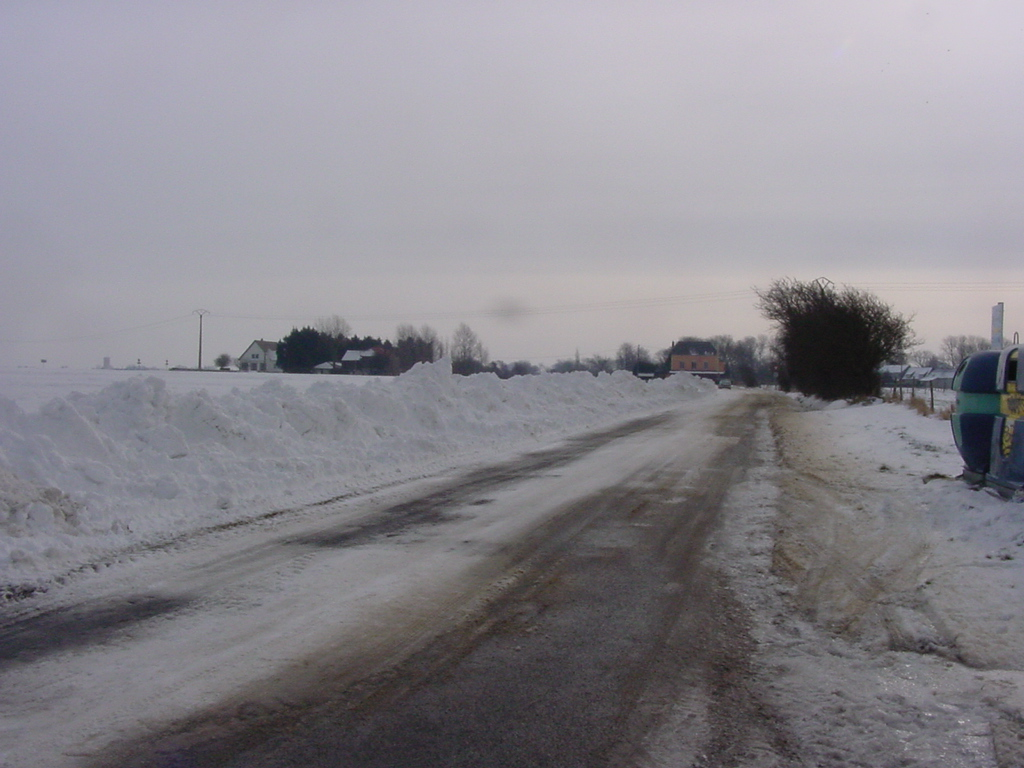

== See also ==
Communes of the Somme department
