= Monchy-sur-Eu =

Commune in Seine-Maritime, France

- Commune
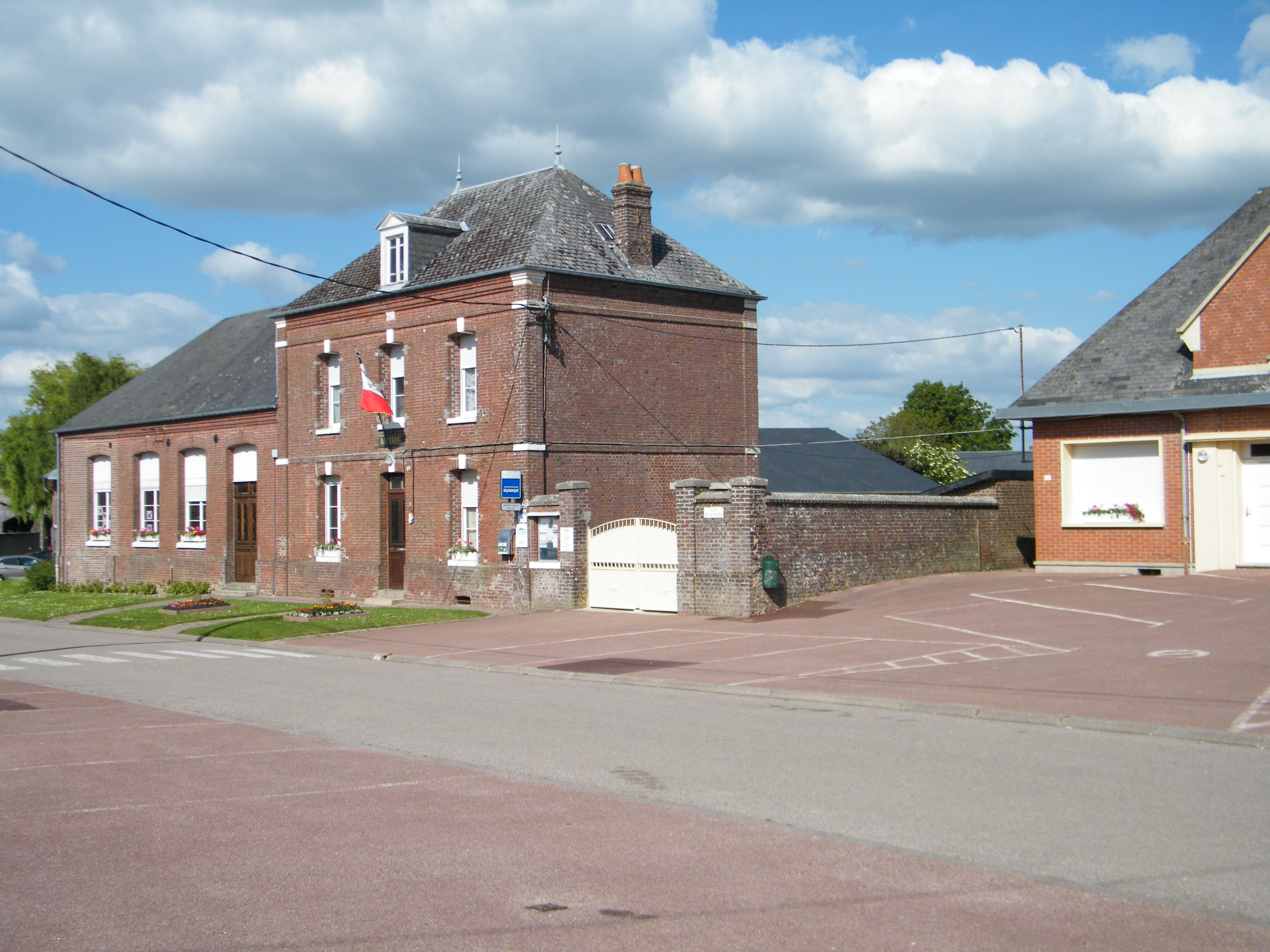
- The town hall and school in Monchy-sur-Eu

- Coat of arms
- Location of Monchy-sur-Eu
- Location within France Location within Normandy
- Coordinates: 49°59′45″N 1°27′14″E
- Country: France
- Region: Normandy
- Department: Seine-Maritime
- Arrondissement: Dieppe
- Canton: Eu
- Intercommunality: CC Villes Sœurs

Government
  - Mayor (2026–32): Christian Coulombel
- Area^{1}: 8.99 km^{2} (3.47 sq mi)
- Elevation: 119 m (390 ft)
- Highest elevation: 142 m (466 ft)
- Lowest elevation: 49 m (161 ft)
- Population (2023): 551
  - Density: 61.3/km^{2} (159/sq mi)
- Time zone: UTC+01:00 (CET)
  - Summer (DST): UTC+02:00 (CEST)
- INSEE/Postal code: 76442 /76260
- ^{1} French Land Register data, which excludes lakes, ponds, glaciers > 1 km^{2} (0.386 sq mi or 247 acres) and river estuaries.

Monchy-sur-Eu is a commune in the Seine-Maritime department in the Normandy region in northern France.

== Geography ==
A forestry and farming village situated in the Pays de Bray, some 20 miles (32 km) northeast of Dieppe at the junction of the D126 and the D58 roads.

== Heraldry ==
Arms of Monchy-sur-Eu	The arms of Monchy-sur-Eu are blazoned : Argent, within a square voided tenné, a trefoil, all within a bordure vert. (tenné may not be a 'proper' tincture but it's the closest that English heraldry has to orange.)

== Population ==
Historical population
Year	Pop.	±% p.a.
1968	431	—
1975	398	−1.13%
1982	431	+1.14%
1990	478	+1.30%
1999	492	+0.32%
2007	544	+1.26%
2012	584	+1.43%
2017	587	+0.10%
2023	551	−1.05%
Source: INSEE

== Places of interest ==
- The church of St. Riquier, dating from the seventeenth century.

== See also ==
- Communes of the Seine-Maritime department
