= Melleville =

- Commune
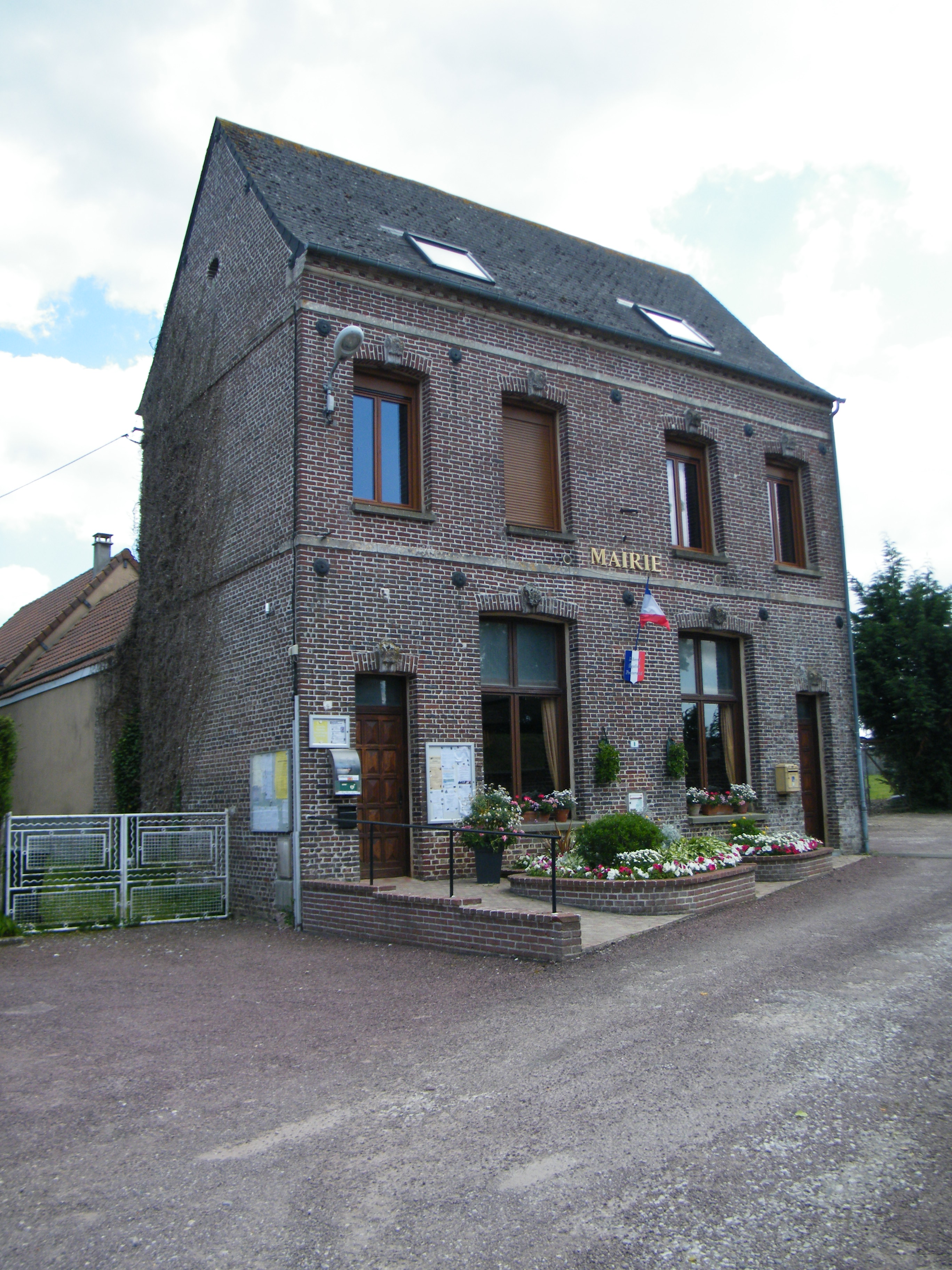
- The town hall in Melleville

- Coat of arms
- Location of Melleville
- Location within France Location within Normandy
- Coordinates: 49°57′31″N 1°28′23″E
- Country: France
- Region: Normandy
- Department: Seine-Maritime
- Arrondissement: Dieppe
- Canton: Eu
- Intercommunality: CC Villes Sœurs

Government
  - Mayor (2026–32): Agnès Join
- Area^{1}: 9.09 km^{2} (3.51 sq mi)
- Elevation: 160 m (520 ft)
- Highest elevation: 189 m (620 ft)
- Lowest elevation: 83 m (272 ft)
- Population (2023): 264
  - Density: 29.0/km^{2} (75.2/sq mi)
- Time zone: UTC+01:00 (CET)
  - Summer (DST): UTC+02:00 (CEST)
- INSEE/Postal code: 76422 /76260
- ^{1} French Land Register data, which excludes lakes, ponds, glaciers > 1 km^{2} (0.386 sq mi or 247 acres) and river estuaries.

Melleville (French pronunciation: [mɛlvil]) is a commune in the Seine-Maritime department in the Normandy region in northern France.

== Geography ==
A farming village situated in the Pays de Bray, some 20 miles (32 km) east of Dieppe at the junction of the D315 and the D78 roads.

== Population ==
Historical population
Year	Pop.	±% p.a.
1968	280	—
1975	277	−0.15%
1982	274	−0.16%
1990	281	+0.32%
1999	294	+0.50%
2007	282	−0.52%
2012	262	−1.46%
2017	264	+0.15%
2023	264	+0.00%
Source: INSEE

== Places of interest ==
- The church of St.Martin, dating from the seventeenth century.
- Traces of a feudal castle.

== See also ==
- Communes of the Seine-Maritime department
