= Saint-Rémy-Boscrocourt =

- Commune
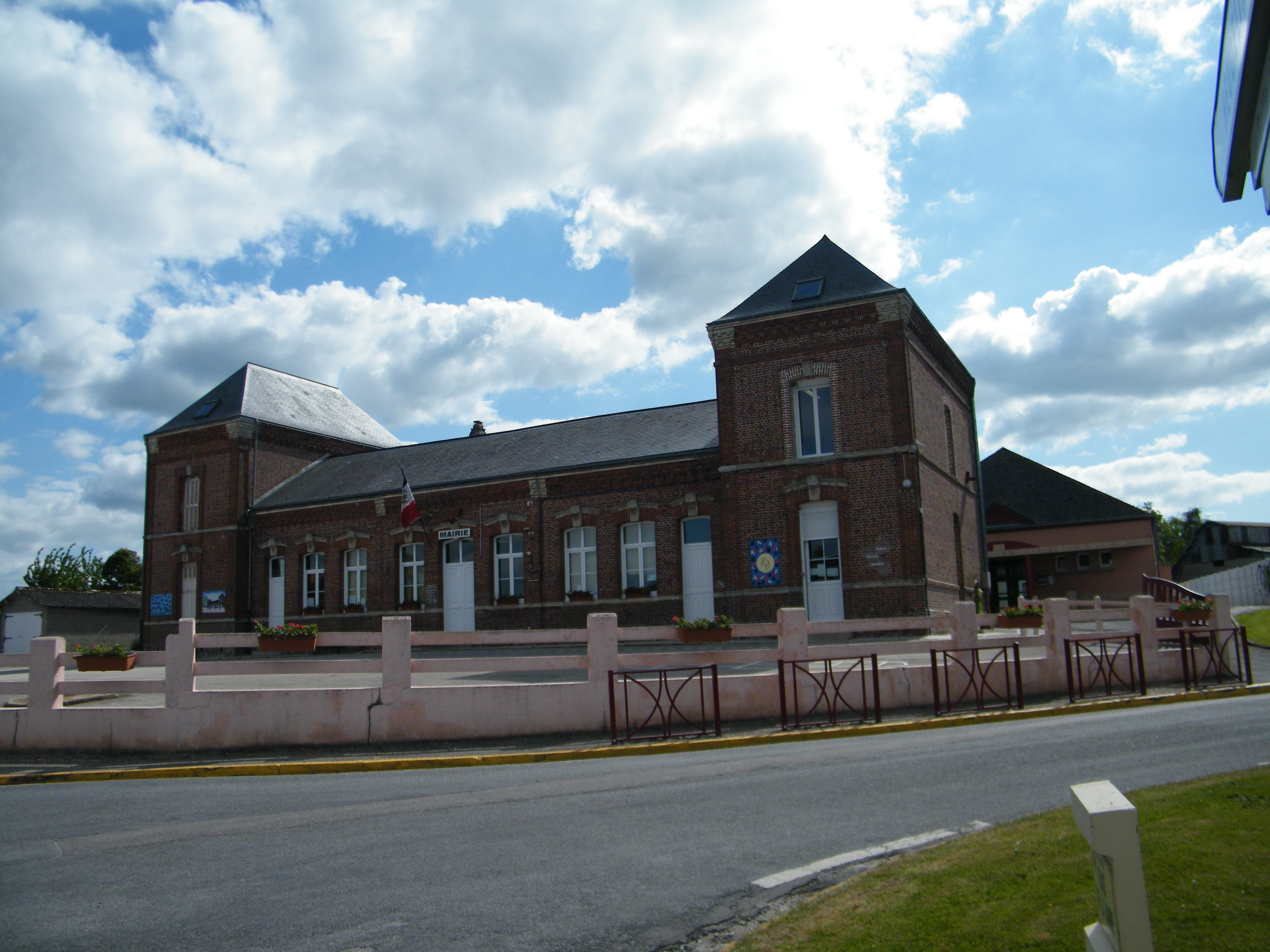
- The town hall in Saint-Rémy-Boscrocourt

- Coat of arms
- Location of Saint-Rémy-Boscrocourt
- Location within France Location within Normandy
- Coordinates: 50°00′36″N 1°23′45″E
- Country: France
- Region: Normandy
- Department: Seine-Maritime
- Arrondissement: Dieppe
- Canton: Eu
- Intercommunality: CC Villes Sœurs

Government
  - Mayor (2026–32): Martine Douay Hagnere
- Area^{1}: 8.37 km^{2} (3.23 sq mi)
- Elevation: 90 m (300 ft)
- Highest elevation: 106 m (348 ft)
- Lowest elevation: 50 m (160 ft)
- Population (2023): 803
  - Density: 95.9/km^{2} (248/sq mi)
- Time zone: UTC+01:00 (CET)
  - Summer (DST): UTC+02:00 (CEST)
- INSEE/Postal code: 76644 /76260
- ^{1} French Land Register data, which excludes lakes, ponds, glaciers > 1 km^{2} (0.386 sq mi or 247 acres) and river estuaries.

Saint-Rémy-Boscrocourt is a commune in the Seine-Maritime department in the Normandy region in northern France.

== Geography ==
A village of farming and associated light industry situated in the Pays de Caux, some 14 miles (23 km) northeast of Dieppe at the junction of the D78, D126 and the D22 roads.

== Population ==
Historical population
Year	Pop.	±% p.a.
1968	618	—
1975	641	+0.52%
1982	635	−0.13%
1990	672	+0.71%
1999	694	+0.36%
2007	756	+1.08%
2012	780	+0.63%
2017	803	+0.58%
2023	803	+0.00%
Source: INSEE

== Places of interest ==
- The church of St.Remi, dating from the sixteenth century.
- The church of St.Marguerite at Boscrocourt, dating from the thirteenth century.

== See also ==
- Communes of the Seine-Maritime department
