= Saint-Pierre-en-Val =

- Commune
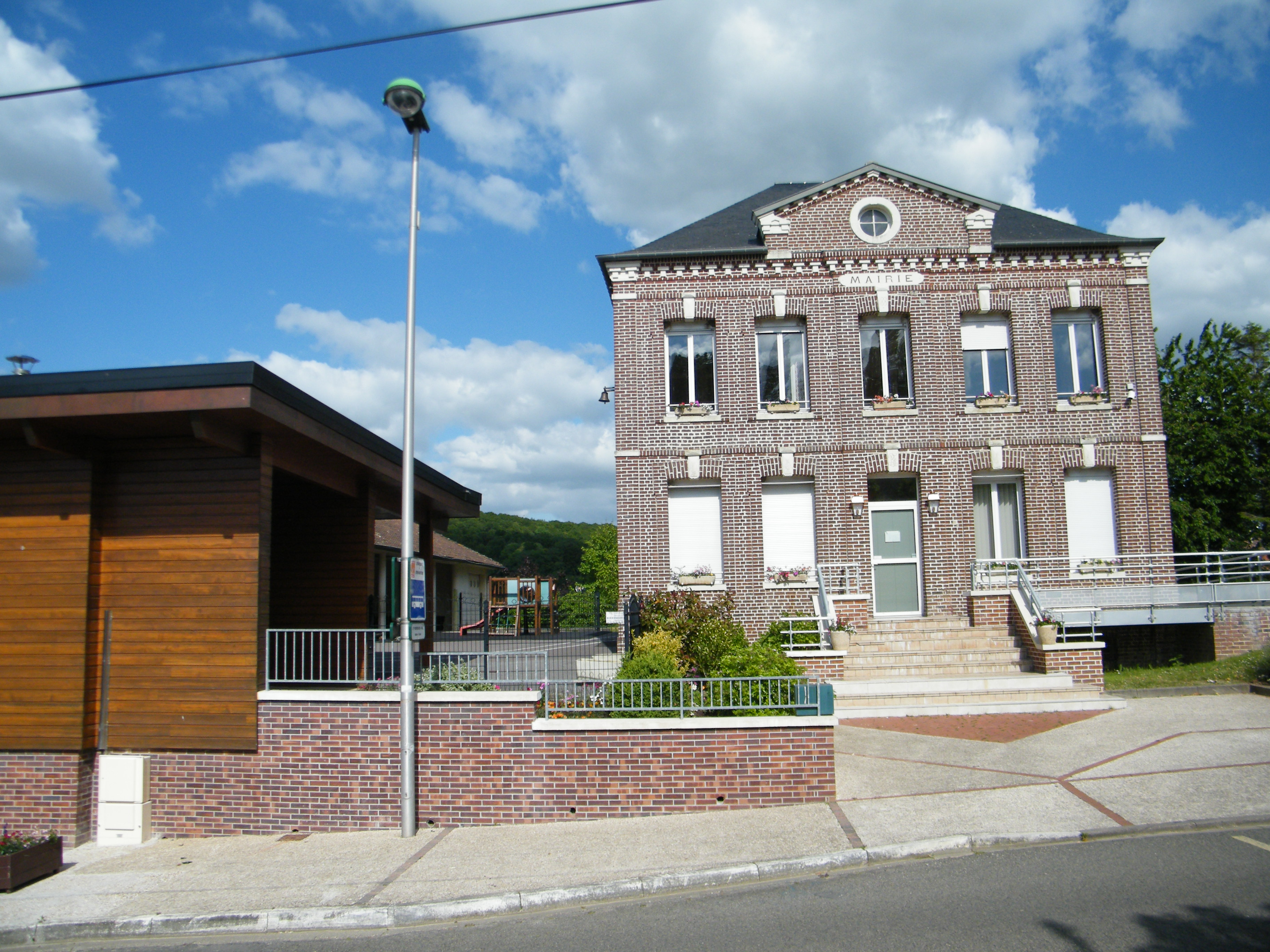
- The town hall in Saint-Pierre-en-Val

- Coat of arms
- Location of Saint-Pierre-en-Val
- Location within France Location within Normandy
- Coordinates: 50°01′20″N 1°26′52″E
- Country: France
- Region: Normandy
- Department: Seine-Maritime
- Arrondissement: Dieppe
- Canton: Eu
- Intercommunality: CC Villes Sœurs

Government
  - Mayor (2026–32): Catherine Vittecoq
- Area^{1}: 7.73 km^{2} (2.98 sq mi)
- Elevation: 50 m (160 ft)
- Highest elevation: 142 m (466 ft)
- Lowest elevation: 40 m (130 ft)
- Population (2023): 1,088
  - Density: 141/km^{2} (365/sq mi)
- Time zone: UTC+01:00 (CET)
  - Summer (DST): UTC+02:00 (CEST)
- INSEE/Postal code: 76638 /76260
- ^{1} French Land Register data, which excludes lakes, ponds, glaciers > 1 km^{2} (0.386 sq mi or 247 acres) and river estuaries.

Saint-Pierre-en-Val (French pronunciation: [sɛ̃ pjɛʁ ɑ̃ val]) is a commune in the Seine-Maritime department in the Normandy region in northern France.

== Geography ==
A forestry and farming village situated in the valley of the river Bresle in the Pays de Bray, some 19 miles (31 km) northeast of Dieppe, at the junction of the D120 and the D1314 roads.

== Heraldry ==
Arms of Saint-Pierre-en-Val	The arms of Saint-Martin-Pierre-en-Val are blazoned : Azure, 2 keys addorsed Or, on a chief argent a pine cone vert between 2 crescents gules.

== Population ==
Historical population
Year	Pop.	±% p.a.
1968	671	—
1975	715	+0.91%
1982	856	+2.60%
1990	978	+1.68%
1999	1,018	+0.45%
2007	1,115	+1.14%
2012	1,111	−0.07%
2017	1,100	−0.20%
2023	1,088	−0.18%
Source: INSEE

== Places of interest ==
- The church of St. Pierre, dating from the thirteenth century.

== See also ==
- Communes of the Seine-Maritime department
