= Seine-Maritime =

Department of France

- Department
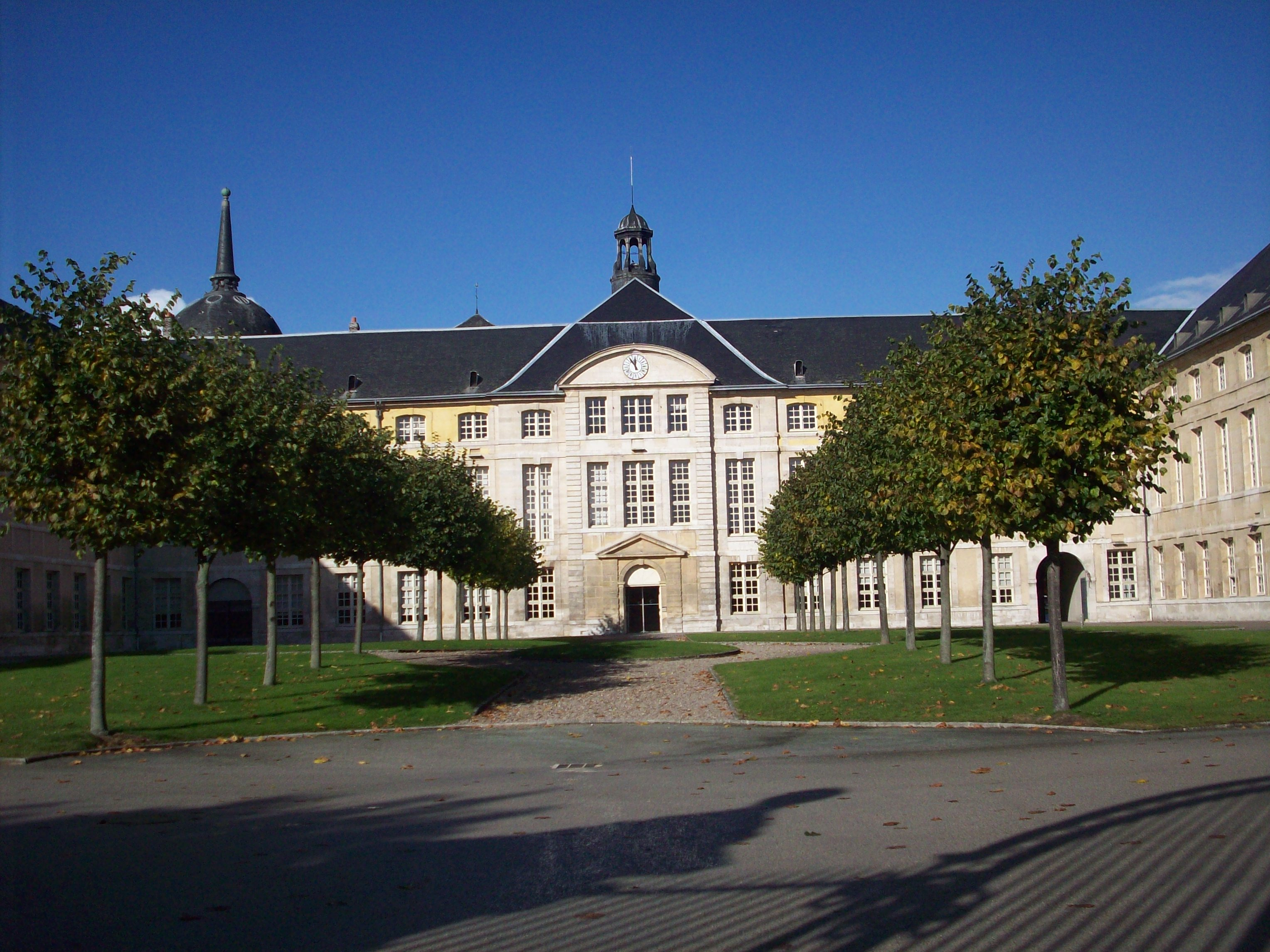
- Prefecture building of the Seine-Maritime department, in Rouen

- Flag Coat of arms

- Location of Seine-Maritime in France
- Coordinates: 49°40′N 0°50′E
- Country: France
- Region: Normandy
- Prefecture: Rouen
- Subprefectures: Dieppe; Le Havre

Government
  - President of the Departmental Council: Bertrand Bellanger

Area^{1}
  - Total: 6,278 km^{2} (2,424 sq mi)

Population (2023)
  - Total: 1,260,964
  - Rank: 16th
  - Density: 200.9/km^{2} (520.2/sq mi)
- Time zone: UTC+1 (CET)
  - Summer (DST): UTC+2 (CEST)
- ISO 3166 code: FR-76
- Department number: 76
- Arrondissements: 3
- Cantons: 35
- Communes: 707
- ^1 French Land Register data, which exclude estuaries, and lakes, ponds, and glaciers larger than 1 km^{2}

Seine-Maritime (French pronunciation: [sɛn maʁitim]) is a department of France in the Normandy region of northern France. It is situated on the northern coast of France, at the mouth of the Seine, and includes the cities of Rouen and Le Havre. Until 1955 it was named Seine-Inférieure. It had a population of 1,260,964 in 2023.

== History ==
The department of Seine-Inférieure was created from part of the old province of Normandy during the French Revolution on 4 March 1790 by the application of a law of 22 December 1789.

After the victory at Waterloo of the coalition armies, the department was occupied by the British Army from June 1815 to November 1818.

In Rouen, Elbeuf and Bolbec, the number of textile factories increased. Metallurgy and naval construction were other industries in the department.

After President Louis-Napoléon Bonaparte's coup d'état in 1851, Seine-Inférieure was one of several departments to be placed under a state of emergency (in French, literally, state of siege) because fears of significant republican resistance to the new government.

In 1942, during the German occupation of the Second World War, two Allied raids, the Bruneval and Dieppe, took place in towns of the English Channel coast.

In 1955, the department's name was officially renamed to Seine-Maritime.

=== Heraldry ===
The arms of the departement Seine-Maritime are blazoned : Gules a fess wavy argent between two lions passant gardant or armed and langued azure.

== Geography ==
The department can be split into three main areas:

- The Seine valley. The Seine flows through the provincial capital Rouen.
- The chalk plateau Pays de Caux, with its abrupt coastline (the Alabaster Coast).
- The Norman Pays de Bray, with its hills and bocage landscape.

=== Administration ===
The département was created in 1790 as Seine-Inférieure, one of five departements that replaced the former province of Normandy. In 1800 five arrondissements were created within the département, namely Rouen, Le Havre, Dieppe, Neufchatel and Yvetot, although the latter two were disbanded in 1926. On 18 January 1955 the name of the département was changed to Seine-Maritime, in order to provide a more positive-sounding name and in-keeping with changes made in a number of other French departements.

=== Principal towns ===
The most populous commune is Le Havre, followed by the prefecture, Rouen. As of 2023, eight communes had more than 20,000 inhabitants:

Commune	Population (2023)
Le Havre	166,687
Rouen	117,662
Saint-Étienne-du-Rouvray	29,518
Sotteville-lès-Rouen	29,003
Dieppe	28,496
Le Grand-Quevilly	25,789
Le Petit-Quevilly	22,208
Mont-Saint-Aignan	20,165

== Demographics ==
Historical population

Year	Pop.	±% p.a.
1801	609,843	—
1821	655,804	+0.36%
1831	693,683	+0.56%
1841	737,206	+0.61%
1851	762,039	+0.33%
1861	789,988	+0.36%
1872	790,022	+0.00%
1881	814,068	+0.33%
1891	839,876	+0.31%
1901	853,883	+0.17%
1911	877,383	+0.27%
1921	880,671	+0.04%
1931	905,278	+0.28%

Year	Pop.	±% p.a.
1936	915,628	+0.23%
1946	846,131	−0.79%
1954	941,684	+1.35%
1962	1,035,844	+1.20%
1968	1,113,977	+1.22%
1975	1,172,743	+0.74%
1982	1,193,108	+0.25%
1990	1,223,429	+0.31%
1999	1,239,138	+0.14%
2007	1,244,611	+0.06%
2012	1,253,931	+0.15%
2017	1,254,378	+0.01%
2023	1,260,964	+0.09%

Previously lacking a demonym, the inhabitants of Seine-Maritime (as the department had been renamed in 1955) chose, following a public consultation, to be identified in official documents as "Seinomarins" (males) and "Seinomarines" (females).

== Politics ==
The president of the Departmental Council is Bertrand Bellanger, elected in 2019.

=== Presidential elections 2nd round ===
Election	Winning candidate	Party	%	2nd place candidate	Party	%
2022	Emmanuel Macron	LREM	55.28	Marine Le Pen	FN	44.72
2017	Emmanuel Macron	LREM	60.42	Marine Le Pen	FN	39.58
2012	François Hollande	PS	54.94	Nicolas Sarkozy	UMP	45.06
2007	Nicolas Sarkozy	UMP	50.20	Ségolène Royal	PS	49.80
2002	Jacques Chirac	RPR	82.58	Jean-Marie Le Pen	FN	17.42

=== Current National Assembly Representatives ===
Constituency	Member	Party
Seine-Maritime's 1st constituency	Florence Hérouin-Léautey	Socialist Party
Seine-Maritime's 2nd constituency	Annie Vidal	Renaissance
Seine-Maritime's 3rd constituency	Édouard Bénard	French Communist Party
Seine-Maritime's 4th constituency	Alma Dufour	La France Insoumise
Seine-Maritime's 5th constituency	Gérard Leseul	Socialist Party
Seine-Maritime's 6th constituency	Patrice Martin	National Rally
Seine-Maritime's 7th constituency	Agnès Firmin-Le Bodo	Horizons
Seine-Maritime's 8th constituency	Jean-Paul Lecoq	French Communist Party
Seine-Maritime's 9th constituency	Marie-Agnès Poussier-Winsback	Horizons
Seine-Maritime's 10th constituency	Robert Le Bourgeois	National Rally

== Transport ==
In 1843 the railway from Paris reached the region. The département is connected to the adjacent Eure department via the Tancarville and Pont de Normandie bridge crossings of the Seine.

== Culture ==
Madame Bovary by Gustave Flaubert is set in Seine Maritime.

The novel La Place by Annie Ernaux largely takes place in Seine-Maritime and describes events and changes that take place in relation to French society in the 20th century especially in relation to the rural population.

The first story of the long-running series Valérian and Laureline is set in Seine-Maritime, with the character Laureline originating from the area.

Cauchois is the dialect of the Pays de Caux, and is one of the most vibrant forms of the Norman language beyond Cotentinais.

== Tourism ==
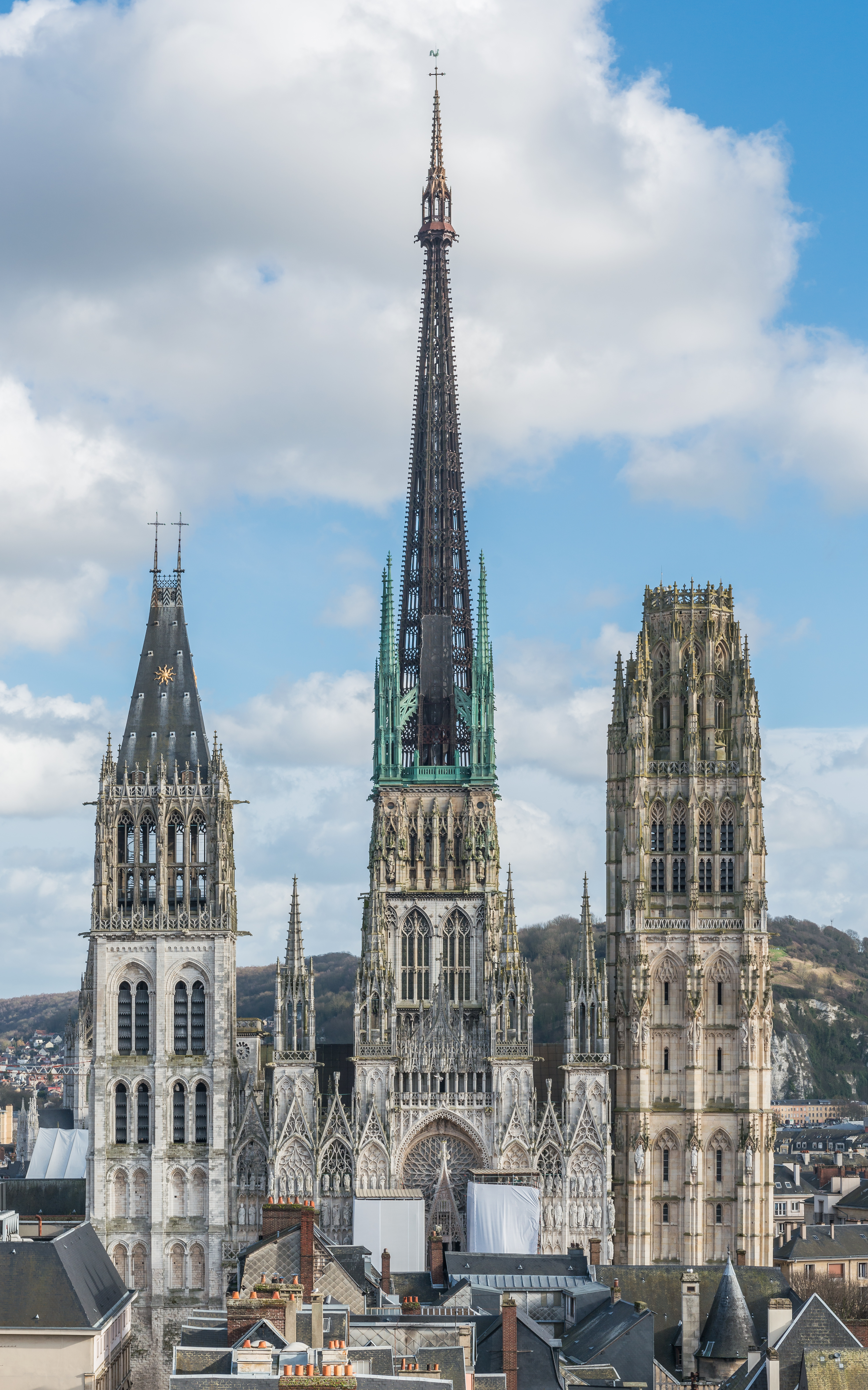
Notre-Dame of Rouen

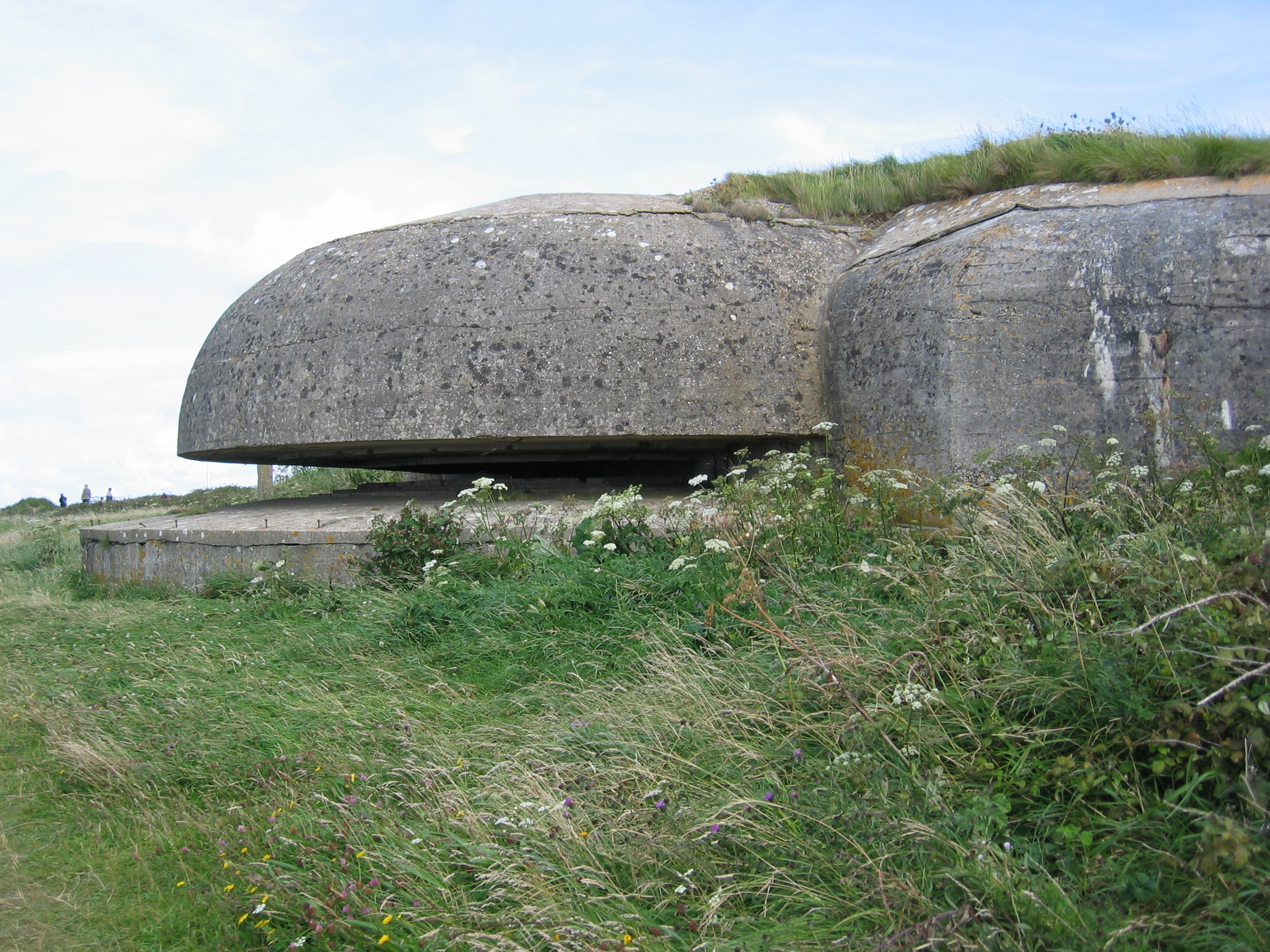
Element of the Atlantic Wall near Fécamp

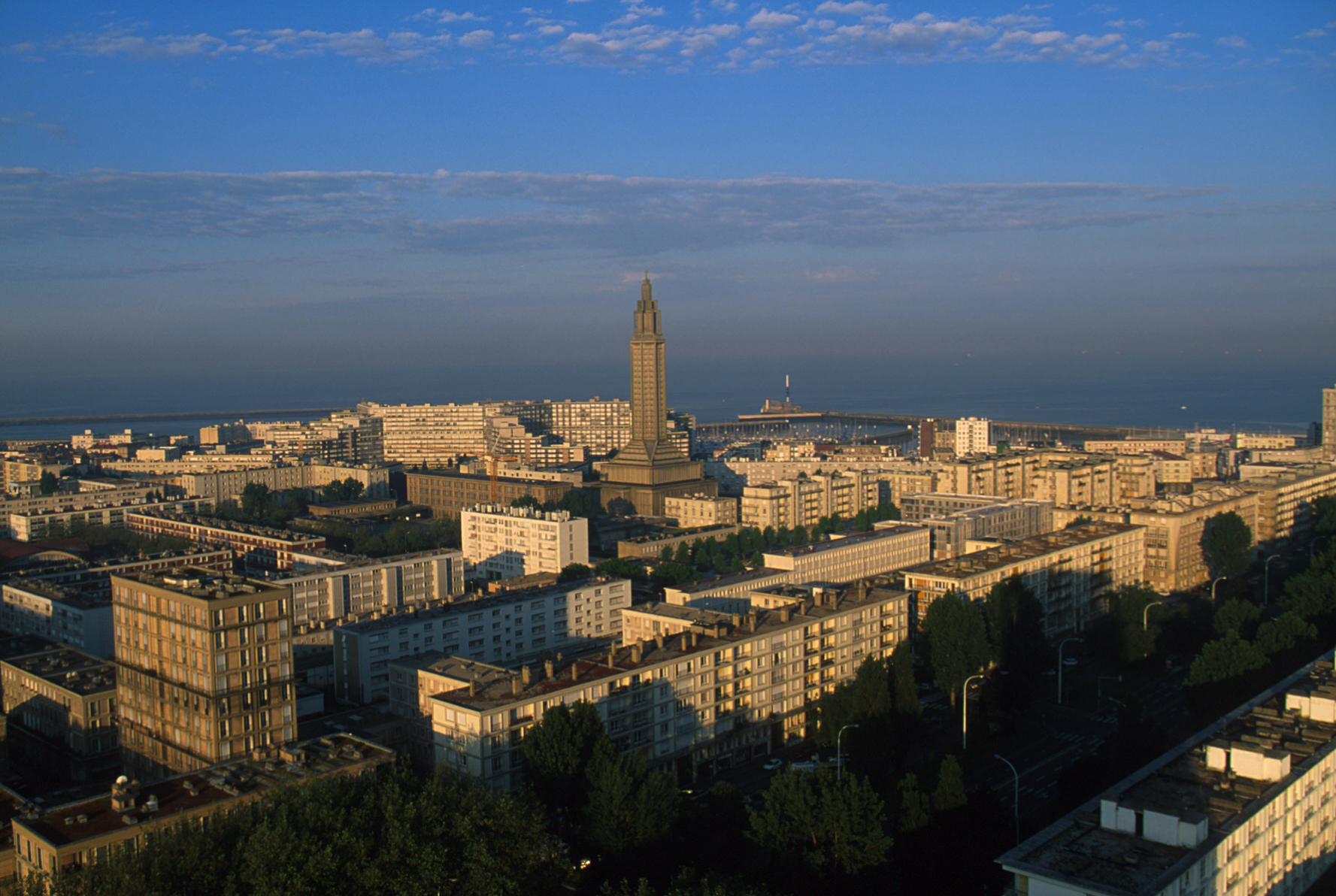
Entirely destroyed during World War II, Le Havre has been rebuilt in modernist style

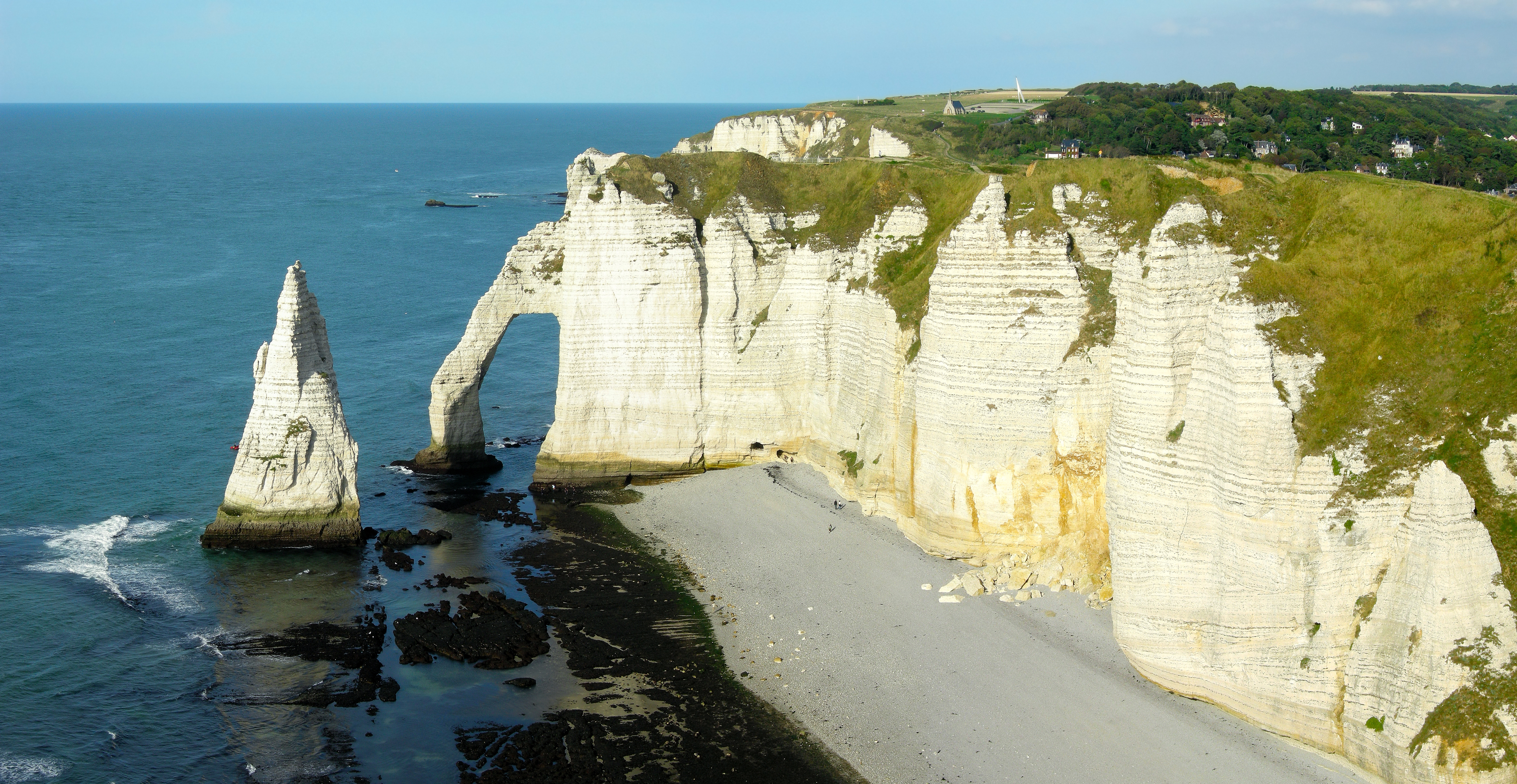
Limestone cliffs of Étretat

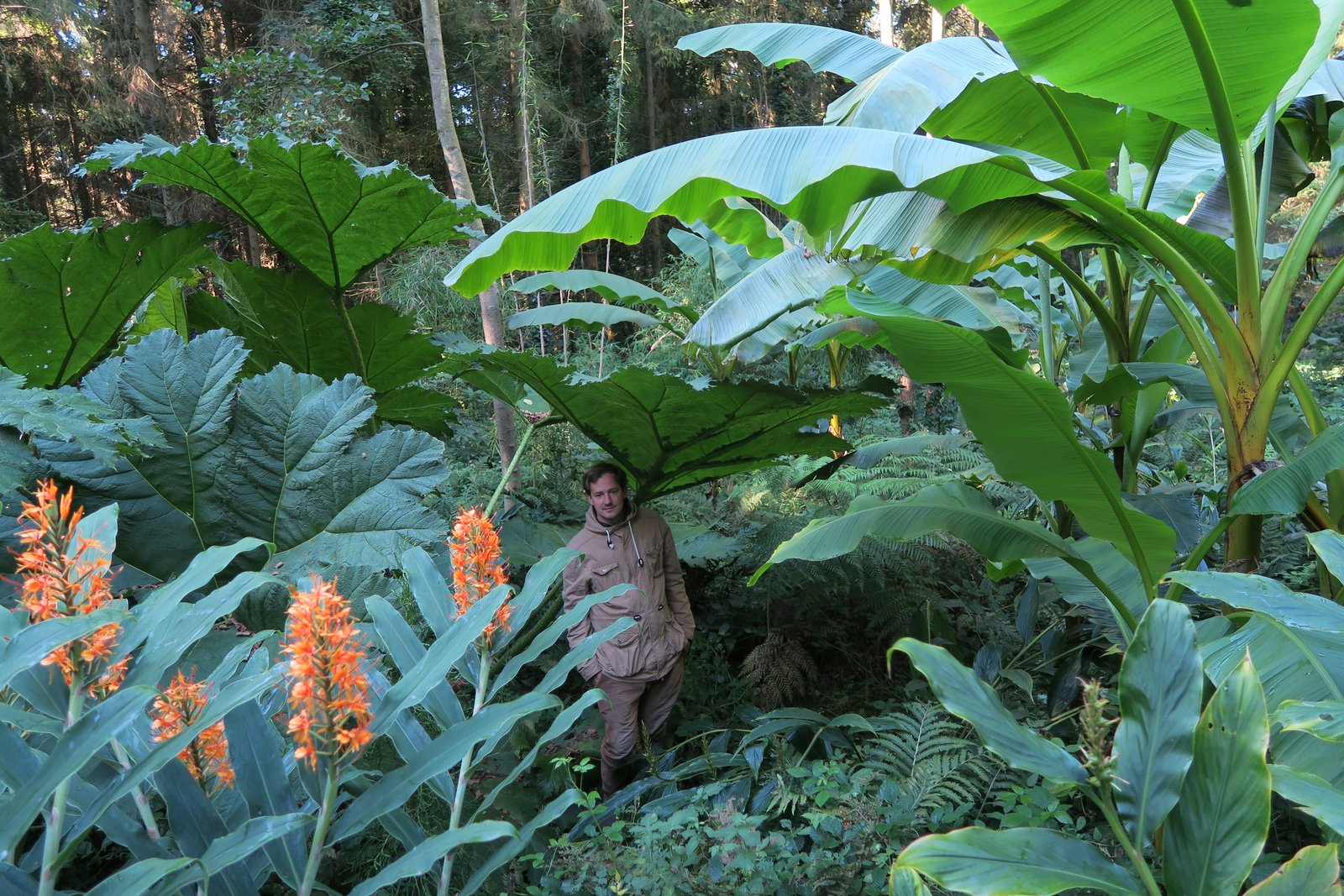
the jardin jungle of Eu

== See also ==
- Arrondissements of the Seine-Maritime department
- Cantons of the Seine-Maritime department
- Communauté de communes d'Yères et Plateaux
- Communes of the Seine-Maritime department
