= Canton of Envermeu =

Coordinates: 49°54′30″N 1°16′23″E

Envermeu
- Former canton
- Interactive map of Envermeu
- Country: France
- Region: Normandy
- Department: Seine-Maritime
- No. of communes: {{{nbcomm}}}
- Disbanded: 2015
- Area: 249.37 km^{2} (96.28 sq mi)
- Population (2012): 17,758
  - Density: 71.211/km^{2} (184.44/sq mi)

The Canton of Envermeu is a former canton situated in the Seine-Maritime département and in the Haute-Normandie region of northern France. It was disbanded following the French canton reorganisation which came into effect in March 2015. It had a total of 17,758 inhabitants (2012).

== Geography ==
A farming area in the arrondissement of Dieppe, centred on the town of Envermeu. The altitude varies from 0m (Biville-sur-Mer) to 196m (Notre-Dame-d'Aliermont) for an average altitude of 90m.

The canton comprised 30 communes:

- Assigny
- Auquemesnil
- Avesnes-en-Val
- Bailly-en-Rivière
- Bellengreville
- Biville-sur-Mer
- Brunville
- Dampierre-Saint-Nicolas
- Douvrend
- Envermeu
- Freulleville
- Glicourt
- Gouchaupre
- Greny
- Guilmécourt
- Les Ifs
- Intraville
- Meulers
- Notre-Dame-d'Aliermont
- Penly
- Ricarville-du-Val
- Saint-Aubin-le-Cauf
- Saint-Jacques-d'Aliermont
- Saint-Martin-en-Campagne
- Saint-Nicolas-d'Aliermont
- Saint-Ouen-sous-Bailly
- Saint-Quentin-au-Bosc
- Saint-Vaast-d'Équiqueville
- Sauchay
- Tourville-la-Chapelle

== Population ==
Historical population Canton of Envermeu
Year	1962	1968	1975	1982	1990	1999
Pop.	11,724	12,776	13,327	14,581	15,958	15,710
±%	—	+9.0%	+4.3%	+9.4%	+9.4%	−1.6%
From the year 1962 on: No double counting – residents of multiple communes (e.g. students and military personnel) are counted only once. Source: INSEE

== See also ==
- Arrondissements of the Seine-Maritime department
- Cantons of the Seine-Maritime department
- Communes of the Seine-Maritime department
