= Jean-Eugène Decorde =

- Born: May 19, 1811; Bois-Héroult, France
- Died: May 5, 1881 (aged 69); Notre-Dame-d'Aliermont, France
- Occupations: Priest, historian
- Writing career
- Period: 19th century
- Genre: History

Jean-Eugène Decorde (May 19, 1811 – May 5, 1881) was a French priest and historian.

== Biography ==
Decorde was born in the village of Bois-Héroult where his parents were farmers. Decorde was ordained as a priest in 1835 and he became the parish priest of Bures (1836–1870), then of Notre-Dame-d'Aliermont (1870–1881).

He was the author of various works, essays and books on the history, archeology and heraldry of Normandy. In 1857 he created a dictionary of the language for the region of Pays de Bray, Dictionnaire du patois du pays de Bray, which is notable because it represents the origins of the French dialect that is spoken in Quebec, Canada. Pays de Bray was one of the major sources of immigrants for the colony of New France in the 1600s.

In 1861, he became a member of the Comité des travaux historiques et scientifiques.

== Works ==
- Un coin de la Normandie. Bures., 1846
- Essai historique et archéologique sur le canton de Neufchâtel, 1848
- Essai historique et archéologique sur le canton de Blangy, Paris : Derache, 1850
- Essai historique et archéologique sur le canton de Londinières, 1851
- Essai historique et archéologique sur le canton de Forges-les-Eaux, 1855
- Dictionnaire du patois du pays de Bray, 1857
- Essai historique et archéologique sur le canton de Gournay, 1860
- Conseils aux instituteurs; réflexions également utiles aux maires, aux délégués cantonaux et aux pères de famille, 1861
- Les Armoiries de la ville de Rouen. Rapport présenté au Conseil municipal par M. Decorde,... sur le projet de frapper un nouveau coin aux armes de la ville, 1871
- Histoire des cinq communes de l'Aliermont : Croixdalle, Sainte-Agathe, Notre-Dame, Saint-Jacques et Saint-Nicolas, 1877
