= Avesnes (disambiguation) =

Avesnes is the name of several villages and towns in France:

- Avesnes, département Pas-de-Calais
- Avesnes (Somme), département Somme, former municipality, now part of Vron.
- Avesnes-Chaussoy, département Somme
- Avesnes-en-Bray, département Seine-Maritime
- Avesnes-en-Saosnois, département Sarthe
- Avesnes-en-Val, département Seine-Maritime
- Avesnes-le-Comte, département Pas-de-Calais
- Avesnes-les-Aubert, département Nord
- Avesnes-lès-Bapaume, département Pas-de-Calais
- Avesnes-le-Sec, département Nord
- Avesnes-sur-Helpe, département Nord, historic city, giving its name to:
  - House of Avesnes, a medieval family
  - Arrondissement of Avesnes-sur-Helpe
