= Grandcourt =

Grandcourt is the name of the following communes in France:

- Grandcourt, Seine-Maritime, in the Seine-Maritime department
- Grandcourt, Somme, in the Somme department
