= Yères =

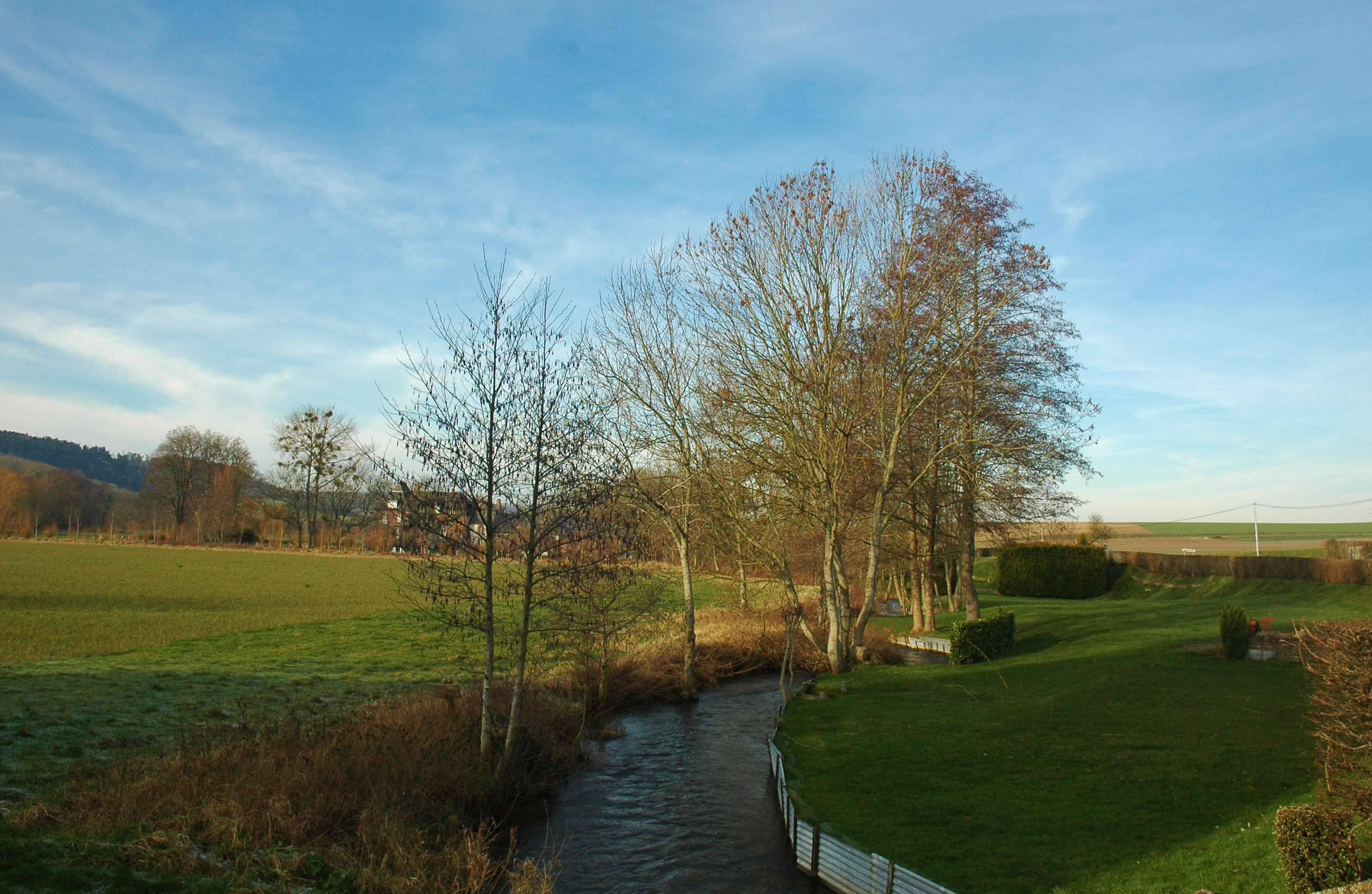

- Native name: L'Yères (French)

Location
- Country: France

Physical characteristics
- Source
  - location: Aubermesnil-aux-Érables
  - elevation: 220 m (720 ft)
- Mouth
  - location: English Channel
  - coordinates: 50.0333°N 1.3101°E
- Length: 40 km (25 mi)
- Basin size: 327 km^{2} (126 sq mi)
- Discharge
  - average: 2.7 m (8 ft 10 in)

The Yères (French pronunciation: [jɛʁ]) is a river of Normandy, France, 40 kilometres (25 mi) in length, flowing through the department of Seine-Maritime.

== Geography ==
The river's source is in the forest of Eu, just south of the village of Aubermesnil-aux-Érables. Its course takes a northerly route past Foucarmont and Fallencourt. It then turns northwestward and passes through the communes of Grandcourt, Villy-sur-Yères, Sept-Meules, Cuverville-sur-Yères, Saint-Martin-le-Gaillard, Touffreville-sur-Eu and finally through Criel-sur-Mer to the sea.

Like most other rivers in the region, the Yères is classified as a first class river, offering anglers the chance to catch trout and lampreys, but not salmon.

== See also ==
- French water management scheme
