= Communauté de communes Falaises du Talou =

Federation of municipalities in Normandy, France

Coordinates: 49.90°N 1.26°E

Falaises du Talou
- Communauté de communes
- Country: France
- Region: Normandy
- Department: Seine-Maritime
- No. of communes: {{{nbcomm}}}
- Established: 1 January 2002

Government
  - President: Gérard Picard
- Area: 328.5 km^{2} (126.8 sq mi)
- Population (2018): 23,598
  - Density: 71.84/km^{2} (186.1/sq mi)
- Website: www.falaisesdutalou.fr

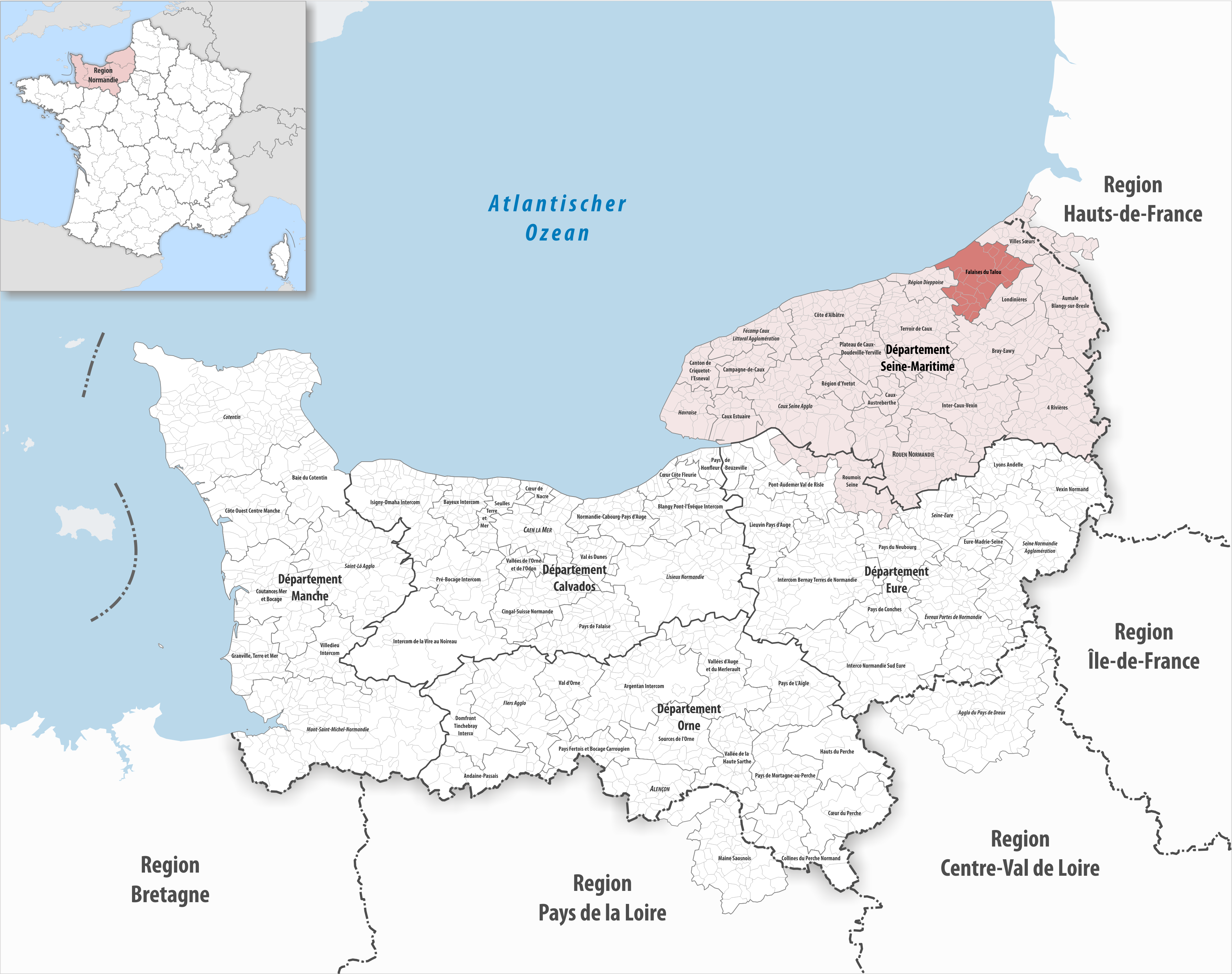

The Communauté de communes Falaises du Talou (before 2017: Communauté de communes des Monts et Vallées) is a federation of 24 municipalities (a communauté de communes) located in the Seine-Maritime département of the Normandy region of north-western France. It was created on 1 January 2002, consisting of 16 communes. On 1 January 2017 it was expanded with 8 communes, and it was renamed Communauté de communes Falaises du Talou. Its seat is Envermeu. Its area is 328.5 km^{2}, and its population was 23,598 in 2018.

== Composition ==
The communauté de communes consists of the following 24 communes:

1. Avesnes-en-Val
2. Bailly-en-Rivière
3. Bellengreville
4. Canehan
5. Cuverville-sur-Yères
6. Dampierre-Saint-Nicolas
7. Douvrend
8. Envermeu
9. Freulleville
10. Les Ifs
11. Meulers
12. Notre-Dame-d'Aliermont
13. Petit-Caux
14. Ricarville-du-Val
15. Saint-Aubin-le-Cauf
16. Saint-Jacques-d'Aliermont
17. Saint-Martin-le-Gaillard
18. Saint-Nicolas-d'Aliermont
19. Saint-Ouen-sous-Bailly
20. Saint-Vaast-d'Équiqueville
21. Sauchay
22. Sept-Meules
23. Touffreville-sur-Eu
24. Villy-sur-Yères

== See also ==
- Communes of the Seine-Maritime department
