= Touffreville-sur-Eu =

- Commune
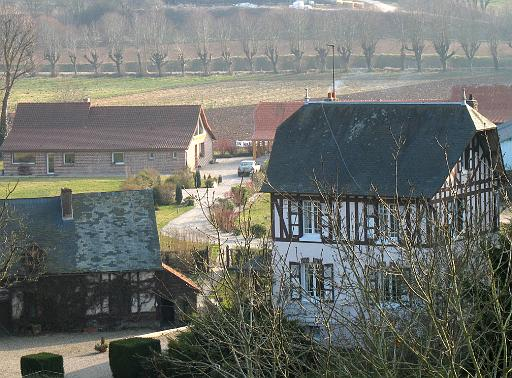
- A view within Touffreville-sur-Eu

- Coat of arms
- Location of Touffreville-sur-Eu
- Location within France Location within Normandy
- Coordinates: 50°00′08″N 1°19′35″E
- Country: France
- Region: Normandy
- Department: Seine-Maritime
- Arrondissement: Dieppe
- Canton: Eu
- Intercommunality: CC Falaises du Talou

Government
  - Mayor (2026–32): Jerome Massy
- Area^{1}: 5.69 km^{2} (2.20 sq mi)
- Elevation: 29 m (95 ft)
- Highest elevation: 100 m (330 ft)
- Lowest elevation: 10 m (33 ft)
- Population (2023): 226
  - Density: 39.7/km^{2} (103/sq mi)
- Time zone: UTC+01:00 (CET)
  - Summer (DST): UTC+02:00 (CEST)
- INSEE/Postal code: 76703 /76910
- ^{1} French Land Register data, which excludes lakes, ponds, glaciers > 1 km^{2} (0.386 sq mi or 247 acres) and river estuaries.

Touffreville-sur-Eu (French pronunciation: [tufʁəvil syʁ ø]) is a commune in the Seine-Maritime department in the Normandy region in northern France.

== Geography ==
A farming village situated in the Pays de Caux by the banks of the river Yères, some 12 miles (19 km) northeast of Dieppe at the junction of the D226, the D454 and the D113 roads.

== Population ==
Historical population
Year	Pop.	±% p.a.
1968	196	—
1975	200	+0.29%
1982	185	−1.11%
1990	175	−0.69%
1999	207	+1.88%
2007	210	+0.18%
2012	193	−1.67%
2017	209	+1.61%
2023	226	+1.31%
Source: INSEE

== Places of interest ==
- The church of St. Sulpice, dating from the thirteenth century.
- A 20-metre high railway viaduct spans the river.

== See also ==
- Communes of the Seine-Maritime department
