= Canton of Dieppe-2 =

Coordinates: 49.93°N 1.09°E

- Canton
- Situation of the canton of Dieppe-2 in the department of Seine-Maritime
- Country: France
- Region: Normandy
- Department: Seine-Maritime
- No. of communes: {{{nbcomm}}}
- Population (2023): 38,042
- INSEE code: 7608

The canton of Dieppe-2 is an administrative division of the Seine-Maritime department, in northern France. It was created at the French canton reorganisation which came into effect in March 2015. Its seat is in Dieppe.

It consists of the following communes:

1. Ancourt
2. Arques-la-Bataille
3. Bailly-en-Rivière
4. Bellengreville
5. Dampierre-Saint-Nicolas
6. Dieppe (partly)
7. Douvrend
8. Envermeu
9. Freulleville
10. Grèges
11. Les Ifs
12. Martin-Église
13. Meulers
14. Notre-Dame-d'Aliermont
15. Petit-Caux
16. Ricarville-du-Val
17. Saint-Aubin-le-Cauf
18. Saint-Jacques-d'Aliermont
19. Saint-Nicolas-d'Aliermont
20. Saint-Ouen-sous-Bailly
21. Saint-Vaast-d'Équiqueville
22. Sauchay
