= Saint-Martin-le-Gaillard =

- Commune
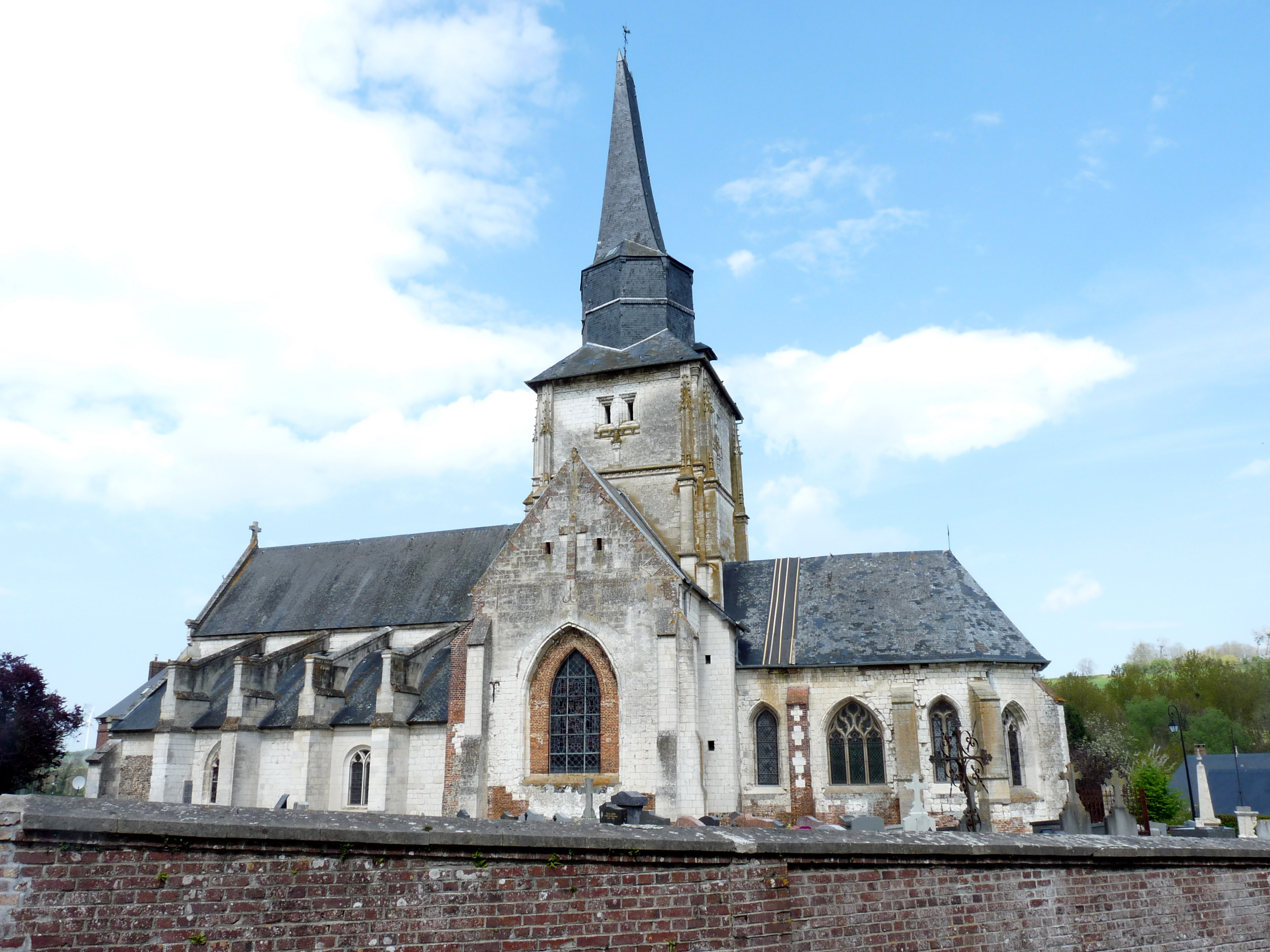
- The Notre-Dame church in Saint-Martin-le-Gaillard

- Coat of arms
- Location of Saint-Martin-le-Gaillard
- Location within France Location within Normandy
- Coordinates: 49°58′45″N 1°22′17″E
- Country: France
- Region: Normandy
- Department: Seine-Maritime
- Arrondissement: Dieppe
- Canton: Eu
- Intercommunality: CC Falaises du Talou

Government
  - Mayor (2020–2026): Martial Fromentin
- Area^{1}: 17.8 km^{2} (6.9 sq mi)
- Elevation: 30 m (98 ft)
- Highest elevation: 158 m (518 ft)
- Lowest elevation: 14 m (46 ft)
- Population (2023): 295
  - Density: 16.6/km^{2} (42.9/sq mi)
- Time zone: UTC+01:00 (CET)
  - Summer (DST): UTC+02:00 (CEST)
- INSEE/Postal code: 76619 /76260
- ^{1} French Land Register data, which excludes lakes, ponds, glaciers > 1 km^{2} (0.386 sq mi or 247 acres) and river estuaries.

Saint-Martin-le-Gaillard (French pronunciation: [sɛ̃ maʁtɛ̃ lə ɡajaʁ]) is a commune in the Seine-Maritime department in the Normandy region in northern France.

== Geography ==
A farming village situated by the banks of the river Yères in the Pays de Caux, at the junction of the D16 and the D113 roads, some 11 miles (18 km) east of Dieppe.

== Heraldry ==
Arms of Saint-Martin-le-Gaillard	The arms of Saint-Martin-le-Gaillard are blazoned : Azure, on a cross argent between in bend 2 trefoils and in bend sinister 2 eagles Or, a lion gules.

== Population ==
Historical population
Year	Pop.	±% p.a.
1968	285	—
1975	253	−1.69%
1982	270	+0.93%
1990	279	+0.41%
1999	315	+1.36%
2007	329	+0.55%
2012	295	−2.16%
2017	298	+0.20%
2023	295	−0.17%
Source: INSEE

== Places of interest ==
- The church of Notre-Dame at St. Martin, dating from the thirteenth century.
- The church of St. Sulpice, dating from the sixteenth century.
- The church of St. Ouen at Auberville, dating from the seventeenth century, now a house.
- Ruins of a feudal castle.

== See also ==
- Communes of the Seine-Maritime department
