= Cuverville-sur-Yères =

- Commune
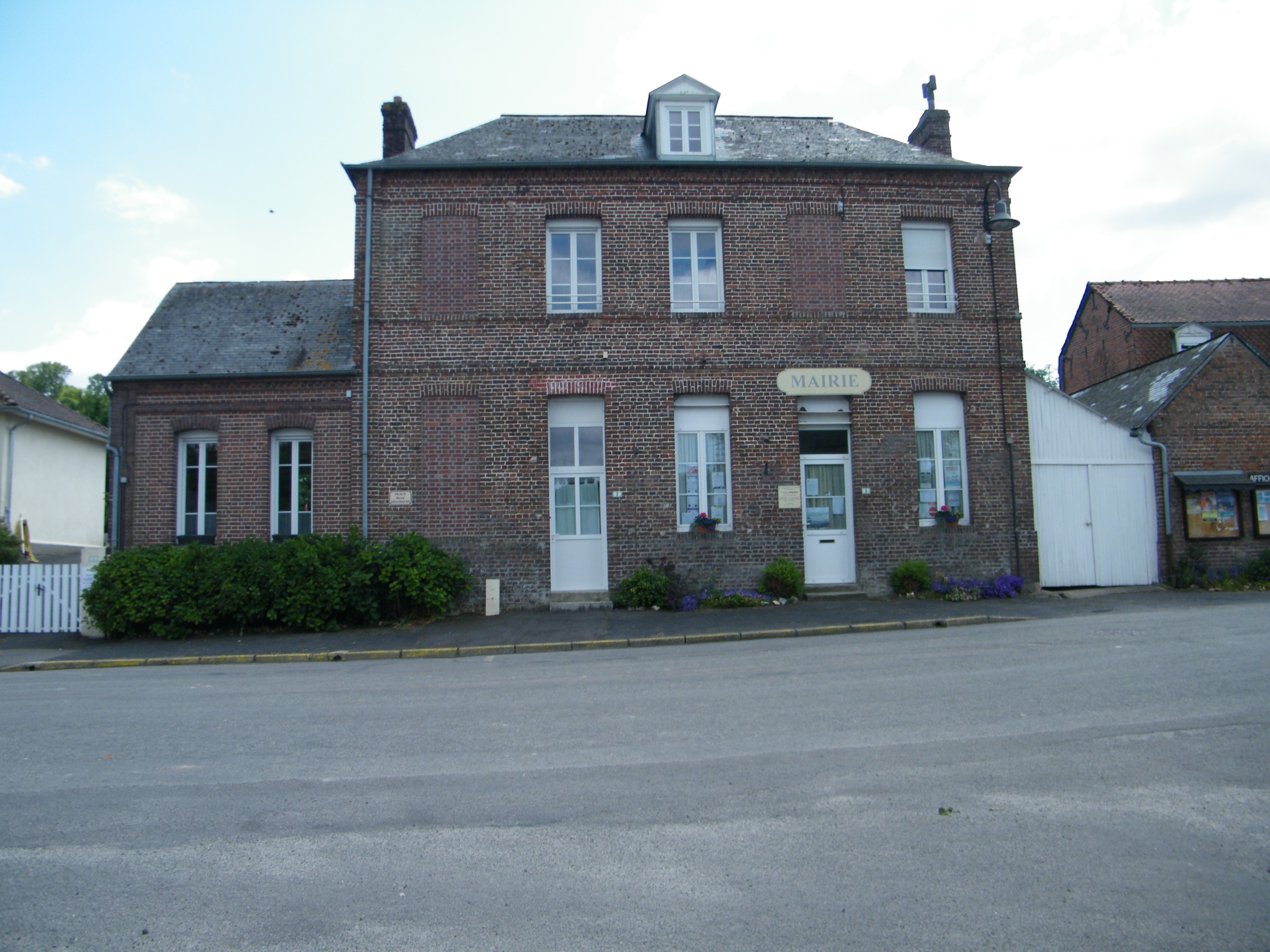
- The town hall and school in Cuverville-sur-Yères
- Location of Cuverville-sur-Yères
- Location within France Location within Normandy
- Coordinates: 49°57′37″N 1°24′00″E
- Country: France
- Region: Normandy
- Department: Seine-Maritime
- Arrondissement: Dieppe
- Canton: Eu
- Intercommunality: CC Falaises du Talou

Government
  - Mayor (2023–2026): Jean-Frédéric Dequidt
- Area^{1}: 11.06 km^{2} (4.27 sq mi)
- Elevation: 44 m (144 ft)
- Highest elevation: 164 m (538 ft)
- Lowest elevation: 32 m (105 ft)
- Population (2023): 193
  - Density: 17.5/km^{2} (45.2/sq mi)
- Time zone: UTC+01:00 (CET)
  - Summer (DST): UTC+02:00 (CEST)
- INSEE/Postal code: 76207 /76260
- ^{1} French Land Register data, which excludes lakes, ponds, glaciers > 1 km^{2} (0.386 sq mi or 247 acres) and river estuaries.

Cuverville-sur-Yères (French pronunciation: [kyvɛʁvil syʁ jɛʁ], literally Cuverville on Yères) is a commune in the Seine-Maritime department in the Normandy region in northern France.

== Geography ==
A small forestry and farming village situated by the banks of the river Yères in the Pays de Caux, some 14 miles (23 km) east of Dieppe, at the junction of the D258 and the D16 roads.

== Population ==
Historical population
Year	Pop.	±% p.a.
1968	237	—
1975	185	−3.48%
1982	176	−0.71%
1990	178	+0.14%
1999	176	−0.13%
2007	227	+3.23%
2012	209	−1.64%
2017	199	−0.98%
2023	193	−0.51%
Source: INSEE

== Places of interest ==
- The church of Notre-Dame, dating from the eighteenth century.
- Ruins of a castle.
- A restored watermill.

== See also ==
- Communes of the Seine-Maritime department
