= Ricarville-du-Val =

- Commune
- Coat of arms
- Location of Ricarville-du-Val
- Location within France Location within Normandy
- Coordinates: 49°48′36″N 1°16′37″E
- Country: France
- Region: Normandy
- Department: Seine-Maritime
- Arrondissement: Dieppe
- Canton: Dieppe-2
- Intercommunality: CC Falaises du Talou

Government
  - Mayor (2026–32): Jean-Jacques Quéhé
- Area^{1}: 5.62 km^{2} (2.17 sq mi)
- Elevation: 48 m (157 ft)
- Highest elevation: 191 m (627 ft)
- Lowest elevation: 37 m (121 ft)
- Population (2023): 197
  - Density: 35.1/km^{2} (90.8/sq mi)
- Time zone: UTC+01:00 (CET)
  - Summer (DST): UTC+02:00 (CEST)
- INSEE/Postal code: 76526 /76510
- ^{1} French Land Register data, which excludes lakes, ponds, glaciers > 1 km^{2} (0.386 sq mi or 247 acres) and river estuaries.

Ricarville-du-Val (French pronunciation: [ʁikaʁvil dy val]) is a commune in the Seine-Maritime department in the Normandy region in northern France.

== Geography ==
A small farming village situated by the banks of the river Béthune in the Pays de Bray on the D114 road, some 16 miles (26 km) southeast of Dieppe.

== Population ==
Historical population
Year	Pop.	±% p.a.
1968	130	—
1975	128	−0.22%
1982	123	−0.57%
1990	118	−0.52%
1999	107	−1.08%
2007	164	+5.48%
2012	159	−0.62%
2017	169	+1.23%
2023	197	+2.59%
Source: INSEE

== Places of interest ==
- Remains of a castle motte.

== See also ==
- Communes of the Seine-Maritime department
