= Criel-sur-Mer =

- Commune
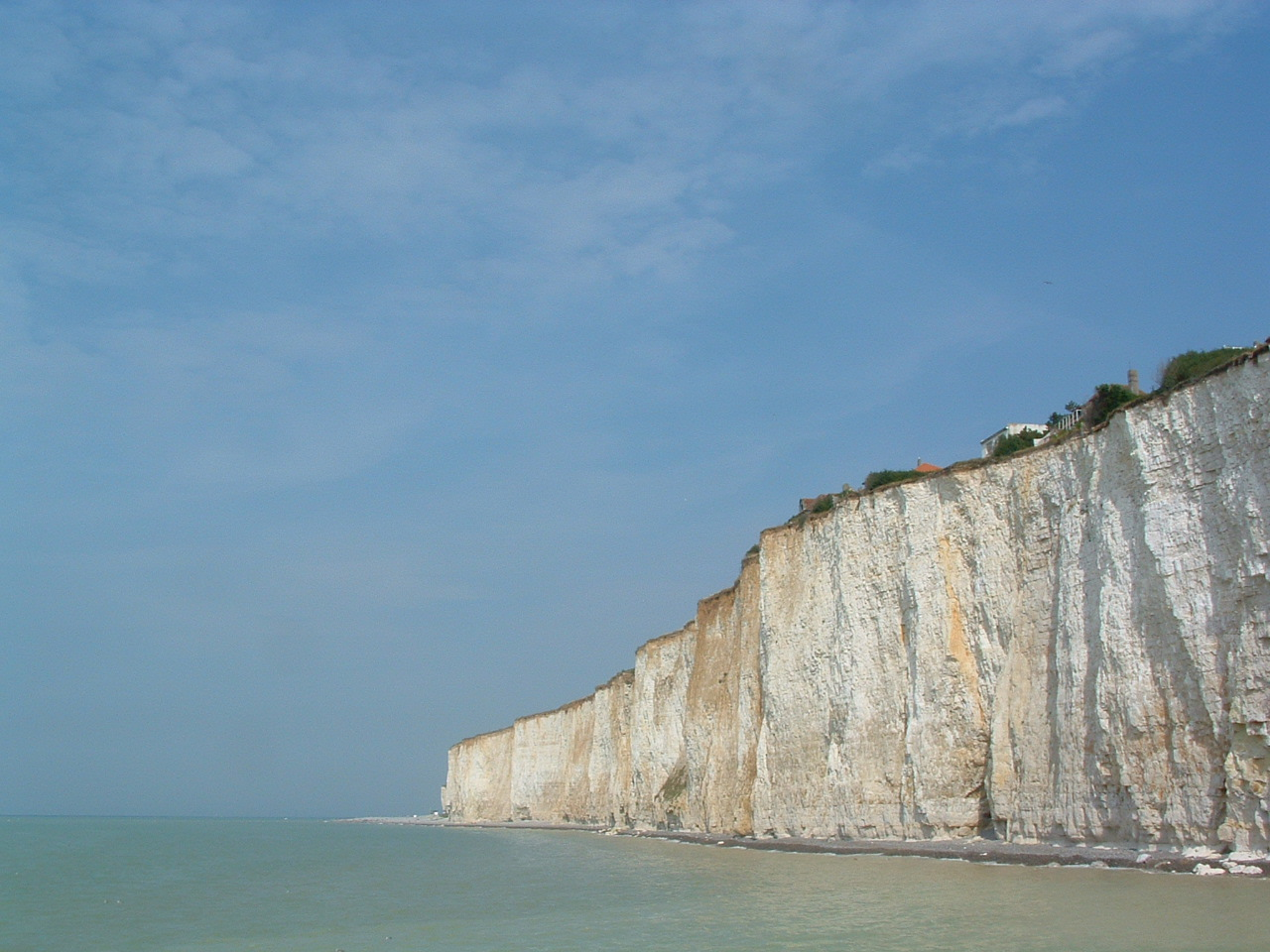
- The cliffs at Criel-sur-Mer

- Coat of arms
- Location of Criel-sur-Mer
- Location within France Location within Normandy
- Coordinates: 50°01′00″N 1°19′06″E
- Country: France
- Region: Normandy
- Department: Seine-Maritime
- Arrondissement: Dieppe
- Canton: Eu
- Intercommunality: CC Villes Sœurs

Government
  - Mayor (2020–2026): Alain Trouessin
- Area^{1}: 21.12 km^{2} (8.15 sq mi)
- Elevation: 15 m (49 ft)
- Highest elevation: 106 m (348 ft)
- Lowest elevation: 0 m (0 ft)
- Population (2023): 2,527
  - Density: 119.6/km^{2} (309.9/sq mi)
- Time zone: UTC+01:00 (CET)
  - Summer (DST): UTC+02:00 (CEST)
- INSEE/Postal code: 76192 /76910
- ^{1} French Land Register data, which excludes lakes, ponds, glaciers > 1 km^{2} (0.386 sq mi or 247 acres) and river estuaries.

Criel-sur-Mer is a commune in the Seine-Maritime department in the Normandy region in northern France.

== Geography ==
Criel-sur-Mer is a town of farming, tourism and light industry situated in the valley and at the mouth of the river Yères, some 12 miles (19 km) northeast of Dieppe. The commune is served by the D16, D940 and the D925 roads. As with much of this coastline, huge chalk cliffs look out over the English Channel. At Criel, they rise to 107m.

Victims of coastal erosion, the chalk cliffs are regularly trimmed, forcing the authorities to ban construction, or even to expropriate the residents near the cliff. The cliffs lose more than one meter per year and erosion now threatens the houses.

== History ==
Criel had its first mention in 1059, as “Criolium”. First cited in 1326, the port was still operating in 1584, but has since closed.

In the 19th century, an amateur archeologist, Father Cochet, found traces of a Gallo-Roman site.

It was the chef-lieu of a canton during the French Revolution.

Criel remained essentially a village of fishermen and farmers until the arrival of the railway in 1872. The existence of the railway station helped establish two elegant seaside resorts here, one near the mouth of the Yères and the other at the suburb of Mesnil-Val. This was the golden age of the Normandy beach resort, that served as the prototype for Trouville, Cabourg and Deauville. In 1902, Criel took the name of Criel-sur-Mer.

The casino was lost in a storm in 1914 and the railway station did not survive the First World War.

Tourism really took off with the advent of paid leave in 1936. Alongside Le Tréport, Criel was the nearest beach to Paris, easily accessible in the 1950s.

Between 1950 and 1972, an industry developed exploiting the pebbles from the beach, for use either in the pharmaceutical industry or crushed for roads.

In 2005, an English residential activity company named Kingswood began using Chateau de Chantereine as a base for its study tours. Since then, hundreds of children each year visit the chateau and its surrounding towns such as Dieppe, Eu and Le Treport as part of their studies. Many local schools have formed partnerships with UK schools with the support of Kingswood.

=== Heraldry ===
Arms of Criel-sur-Mer	The arms of Criel-sur-Mer are blazoned : Argent, 3 ducks gules 1 & 2. Someone claimed they used Normandy Gules, 2 leopards Or.

== Population ==
Historical population
Year	Pop.	±% p.a.
1968	1,927	—
1975	2,108	+1.29%
1982	2,155	+0.32%
1990	2,452	+1.63%
1999	2,670	+0.95%
2007	2,741	+0.33%
2012	2,764	+0.17%
2017	2,680	−0.62%
2023	2,527	−0.97%
Source: INSEE

== Sights ==
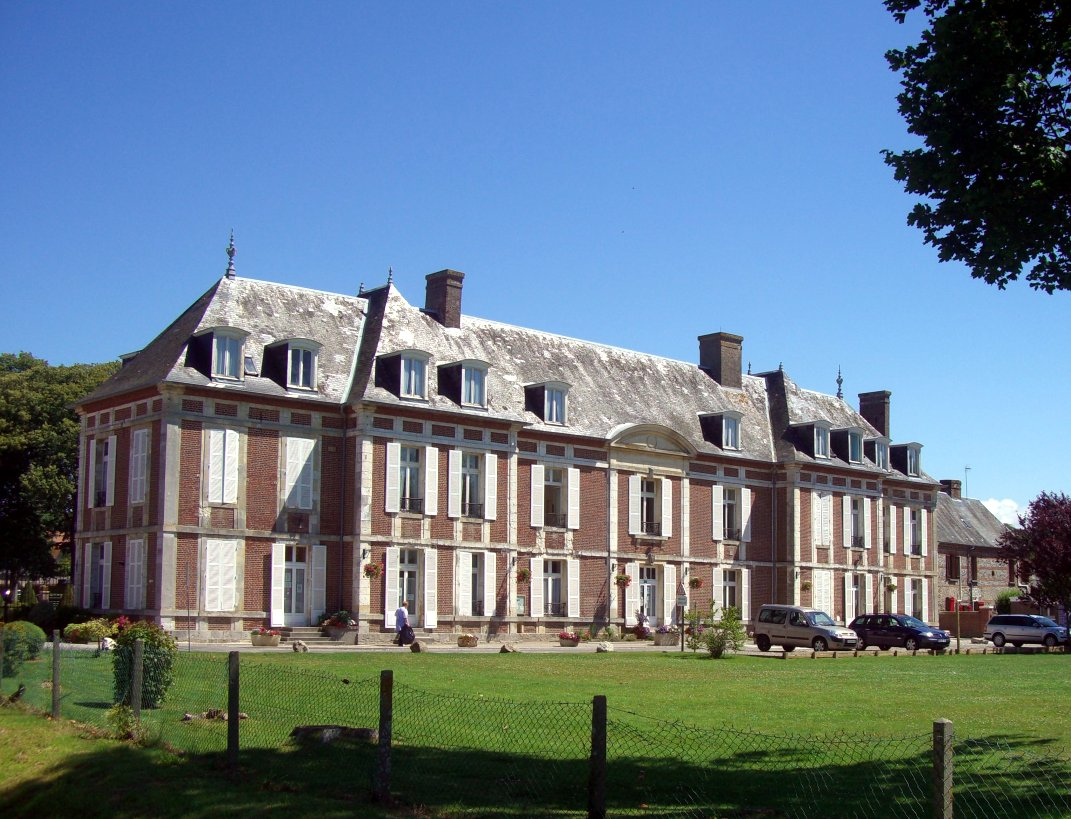
The château de Chantereine

- The manorhouse de Briançon, where the Grande Mademoiselle created a girls' school in 1695. It now houses the mairie.
- The church of St. Aubin, dating from the fifteenth century
- The château de Chantereine
- Some vestiges of the château du Baile
- The ruins of the church of St. Leonard
- A seventeenth century chapel
- The cliffs: Criel-sur-Mer has, with its cliffs rising to 109 m above sea levels, the highest chalk cliffs in Europe.

== See also ==
- Communes of the Seine-Maritime department
