= Meulers =

- Commune
- Location of Meulers
- Location within France Location within Normandy
- Coordinates: 49°50′29″N 1°13′46″E
- Country: France
- Region: Normandy
- Department: Seine-Maritime
- Arrondissement: Dieppe
- Canton: Dieppe-2
- Intercommunality: CC Falaises du Talou

Government
  - Mayor (2026–32): Eric Routier
- Area^{1}: 6.67 km^{2} (2.58 sq mi)
- Elevation: 32 m (105 ft)
- Highest elevation: 153 m (502 ft)
- Lowest elevation: 20 m (66 ft)
- Population (2023): 577
  - Density: 86.5/km^{2} (224/sq mi)
- Time zone: UTC+01:00 (CET)
  - Summer (DST): UTC+02:00 (CEST)
- INSEE/Postal code: 76437 /76510
- ^{1} French Land Register data, which excludes lakes, ponds, glaciers > 1 km^{2} (0.386 sq mi or 247 acres) and river estuaries.

Meulers is a commune in the Seine-Maritime department in the Normandy region in north-western France.

== Geography ==
A forestry and farming village situated by the banks of the Béthune, some 9 miles (14 km) southeast of Dieppe at the junction of the D1 and the D114 roads.

== Population ==
Historical population
Year	Pop.	±% p.a.
1968	378	—
1975	409	+1.13%
1982	408	−0.03%
1990	395	−0.40%
1999	395	+0.00%
2007	562	+4.51%
2012	605	+1.49%
2017	563	−1.43%
2023	577	+0.41%
Source: INSEE

== Places of interest ==
- The church of St. Valery, dating from the eleventh century.

== See also ==
- Communes of the Seine-Maritime department
