= Canehan =

- Commune
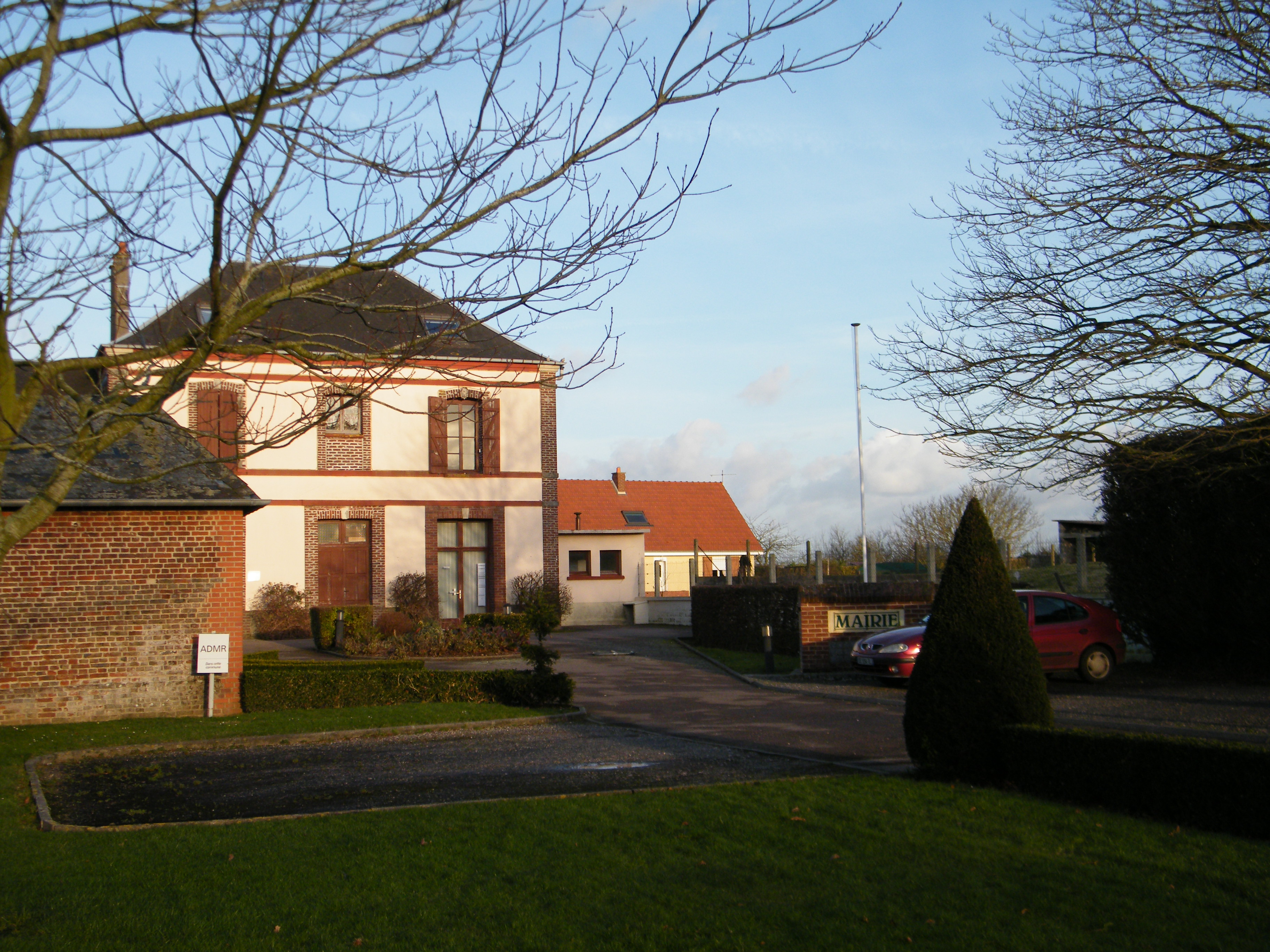
- The town hall in Canehan

- Coat of arms
- Location of Canehan
- Location within France Location within Normandy
- Coordinates: 49°58′40″N 1°20′40″E
- Country: France
- Region: Normandy
- Department: Seine-Maritime
- Arrondissement: Dieppe
- Canton: Eu
- Intercommunality: CC Falaises du Talou

Government
  - Mayor (2020–2026): Daniel Papin
- Area^{1}: 6.18 km^{2} (2.39 sq mi)
- Elevation: 100 m (330 ft)
- Highest elevation: 119 m (390 ft)
- Lowest elevation: 16 m (52 ft)
- Population (2023): 378
  - Density: 61.2/km^{2} (158/sq mi)
- Time zone: UTC+01:00 (CET)
  - Summer (DST): UTC+02:00 (CEST)
- INSEE/Postal code: 76155 /76260
- ^{1} French Land Register data, which excludes lakes, ponds, glaciers > 1 km^{2} (0.386 sq mi or 247 acres) and river estuaries.

Canehan is a commune in the Seine-Maritime department in the Normandy region in northern France.

== Geography ==
A farming village situated in the Pays de Caux, some 16 miles (26 km) northeast of Dieppe, at the junction of the D226 and the D113 roads.

== Population ==
Historical population
Year	Pop.	±% p.a.
1968	263	—
1975	245	−1.01%
1982	289	+2.39%
1990	322	+1.36%
1999	306	−0.56%
2007	317	+0.44%
2012	324	+0.44%
2017	364	+2.36%
2023	378	+0.63%
Source: INSEE

== Places of interest ==
- The church of St.Martin, dating from the twelfth century.

== See also ==
- Communes of the Seine-Maritime department
