= Saint-Ouen-sous-Bailly =

- Commune
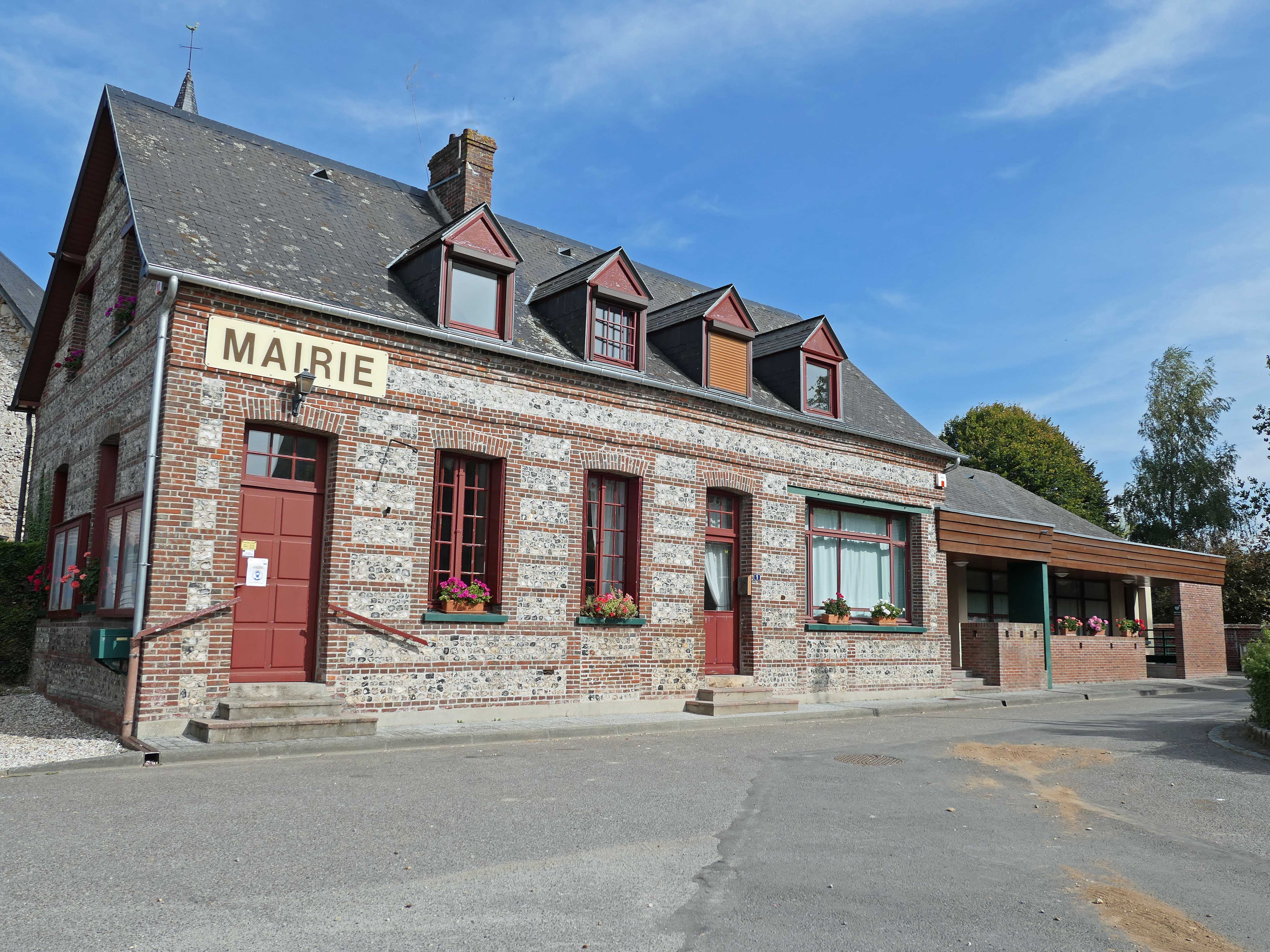
- Town hall

- Coat of arms
- Location of Saint-Ouen-sous-Bailly
- Location within France Location within Normandy
- Coordinates: 49°54′19″N 1°17′54″E
- Country: France
- Region: Normandy
- Department: Seine-Maritime
- Arrondissement: Dieppe
- Canton: Dieppe-2
- Intercommunality: CC Falaises du Talou

Government
  - Mayor (2026–32): Catherine Poulet
- Area^{1}: 5.32 km^{2} (2.05 sq mi)
- Elevation: 50 m (160 ft)
- Highest elevation: 154 m (505 ft)
- Lowest elevation: 41 m (135 ft)
- Population (2023): 221
  - Density: 41.5/km^{2} (108/sq mi)
- Time zone: UTC+01:00 (CET)
  - Summer (DST): UTC+02:00 (CEST)
- INSEE/Postal code: 76630 /76630
- ^{1} French Land Register data, which excludes lakes, ponds, glaciers > 1 km^{2} (0.386 sq mi or 247 acres) and river estuaries.

Saint-Ouen-sous-Bailly (French pronunciation: [sɛ̃t‿wɛ̃ su baji], lit. or 'Saint-Ouen under Bailly') is a commune in the Seine-Maritime department in the Normandy region in northern France.

== Geography ==
A small farming village situated in the Pays de Caux, on the D149 road, some 11 miles (18 km) east of Dieppe.

== Heraldry ==
Arms of Saint-Ouen-sous-Bailly	The arms of Saint-Ouen-sous-Bailly are blazoned : Or, 2 crowned lions respectant gules, and on a chief azure an alerion between 2 lozenges argent.

== Population ==
Historical population
Year	Pop.	±% p.a.
1968	140	—
1975	153	+1.28%
1982	144	−0.86%
1990	152	+0.68%
1999	187	+2.33%
2007	214	+1.70%
2012	223	+0.83%
2017	220	−0.27%
2023	221	+0.08%
Source: INSEE

== Places of interest ==
- The church of St. Ouen, dating from the eleventh century.

== See also ==
- Communes of the Seine-Maritime department
