= Freulleville =

- Commune
- Location of Freulleville
- Location within France Location within Normandy
- Coordinates: 49°49′35″N 1°14′13″E
- Country: France
- Region: Normandy
- Department: Seine-Maritime
- Arrondissement: Dieppe
- Canton: Dieppe-2
- Intercommunality: CC Falaises du Talou

Government
  - Mayor (2026–32): Lionel Perré
- Area^{1}: 11.13 km^{2} (4.30 sq mi)
- Elevation: 35 m (115 ft)
- Highest elevation: 177 m (581 ft)
- Lowest elevation: 26 m (85 ft)
- Population (2023): 386
  - Density: 34.7/km^{2} (89.8/sq mi)
- Time zone: UTC+01:00 (CET)
  - Summer (DST): UTC+02:00 (CEST)
- INSEE/Postal code: 76288 /76510
- ^{1} French Land Register data, which excludes lakes, ponds, glaciers > 1 km^{2} (0.386 sq mi or 247 acres) and river estuaries.

Freulleville (French pronunciation: [fʁœlvil]) is a commune in the Seine-Maritime department in the Normandy region in northern France.

== Geography ==
A village of farming and forestry situated by the banks of the river Béthune in the Pays de Bray, some 10 miles (16 km) southeast of Dieppe, at the junction of the D1, D14 and the D107 roads.

== Population ==
Historical population
| Year | Pop. | ±% p.a. |
|---|---|---|
| 1968 | 278 | — |
| 1975 | 257 | −1.12% |
| 1982 | 230 | −1.57% |
| 1990 | 297 | +3.25% |
| 1999 | 335 | +1.35% |
| 2007 | 350 | +0.55% |
| 2012 | 371 | +1.17% |
| 2017 | 364 | −0.38% |
| 2023 | 386 | +0.98% |
Source: INSEE

== Places of interest ==
- The twelfth century church of Notre-Dame.
- The forest du Croc.

== See also ==
- Communes of the Seine-Maritime department
