= Pierre Laffillé =

French painter

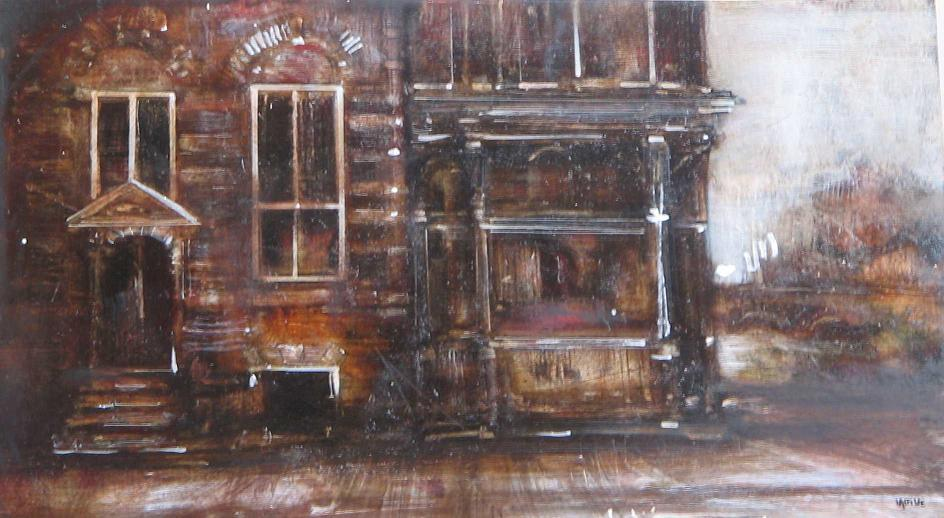
Pierre Laffillé, House, Oil on canvas

Pierre Laffillé (June 1, 1938 – June 4, 2011) was a French painter.

== Biography ==
Laffillé was born in 1938 in Envermeu, Seine-Maritime. He studied at the Académie Julian in Paris in 1956, and then at the École nationale supérieure des Beaux-Arts from 1959 to 1961. His first exhibition was in 1960 at Dieppe. He went on to show his works throughout France and much of the rest of the world, managing at least one major exhibition a year through much of his career.

In The Netherlands he was represented by Aggie Hendrikx who ran an art gallery in the center of Roermond. Aggie Hendrikx published books on his works. Aggie Hendrikx was brutally robbed, beaten and locked in a cupboard during one night. The incident made the news. She retired within 1-2 years after this incident. During this incident some works including works by Pierre Laffillé where stolen and can be found in the Interpol database (2022).

Amongst the awards that he had received, there were the Silver medal of the city of Paris, and the Gold Medal of the city of Montmorency. He was also a Knight of the Ordre des Arts et des Lettres.

He lived and worked in Montmartre, Paris.
