= Grandcourt, Seine-Maritime =

Grandcourt
- Commune
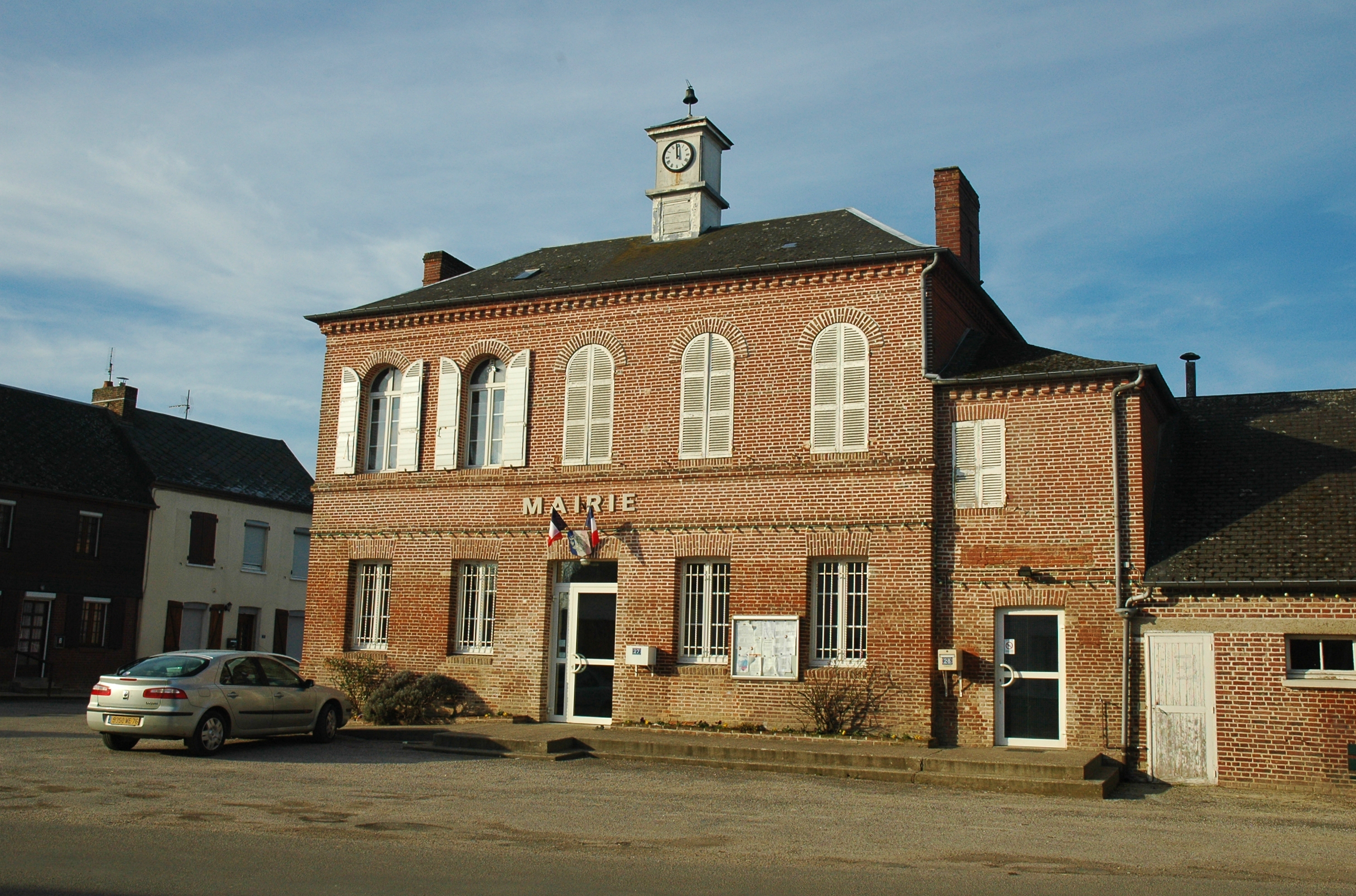
- The town hall in Grandcourt
- Location of Grandcourt
- Location within France Location within Normandy
- Coordinates: 49°54′54″N 1°29′32″E
- Country: France
- Region: Normandy
- Department: Seine-Maritime
- Arrondissement: Dieppe
- Canton: Neufchâtel-en-Bray
- Intercommunality: CC Londinières

Government
  - Mayor (2020–2026): Arnaud de Chezelles
- Area^{1}: 22.44 km^{2} (8.66 sq mi)
- Elevation: 70 m (230 ft)
- Highest elevation: 204 m (669 ft)
- Lowest elevation: 55 m (180 ft)
- Population (2023): 292
  - Density: 13.0/km^{2} (33.7/sq mi)
- Time zone: UTC+01:00 (CET)
  - Summer (DST): UTC+02:00 (CEST)
- INSEE/Postal code: 76320 /76660
- ^{1} French Land Register data, which excludes lakes, ponds, glaciers > 1 km^{2} (0.386 sq mi or 247 acres) and river estuaries.

Grandcourt (French pronunciation: [ɡʁɑ̃kuʁ]) is a commune in the Seine-Maritime department in the Normandy region in northern France.

== Geography ==
A farming and forestry village which was created from five former parishes at the time of the French Revolution. It is situated by the banks of the Yères river, adjacent to the forest of Eu, in the Pays de Bray, some 20 miles (32 km) east of Dieppe and at the junction of the D14, the D16 and the D149 roads.

== Population ==
Historical population
Year	Pop.	±% p.a.
1968	528	—
1975	488	−1.12%
1982	419	−2.15%
1990	337	−2.69%
1999	331	−0.20%
2007	349	+0.66%
2012	363	+0.79%
2017	341	−1.24%
2023	292	−2.55%
Source: INSEE

== Places of interest ==
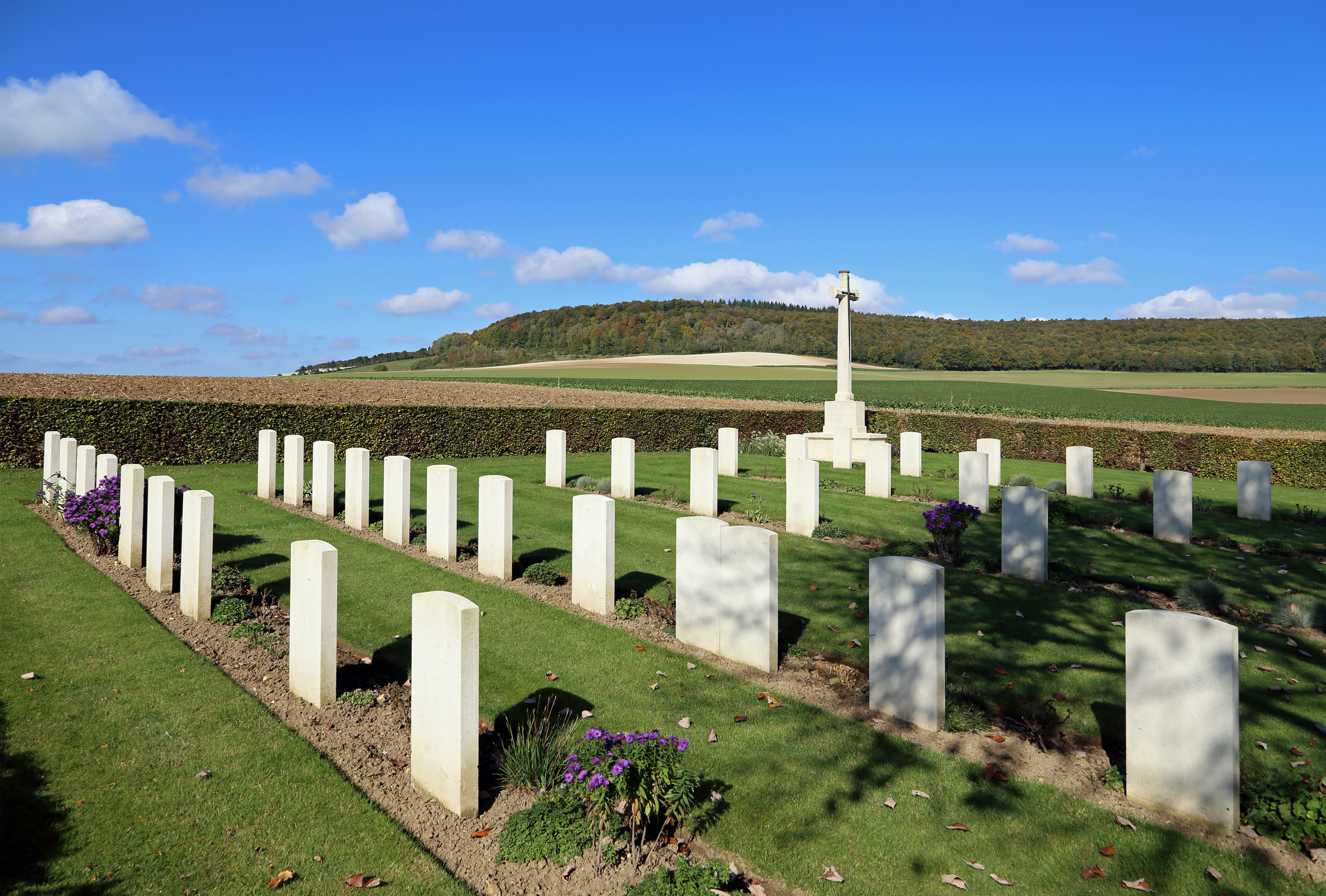
Grandcourt War Cemetery

- The church of St. Martin, dating from the eleventh century.
- The church of St. Wandrille, dating from the nineteenth century.
- Vestiges of an eleventh-century castle motte
- Grandcourt War Cemetery, containing 58 Second World War burials

== See also ==
- Communes of the Seine-Maritime department
