= Douvrend =

- Commune
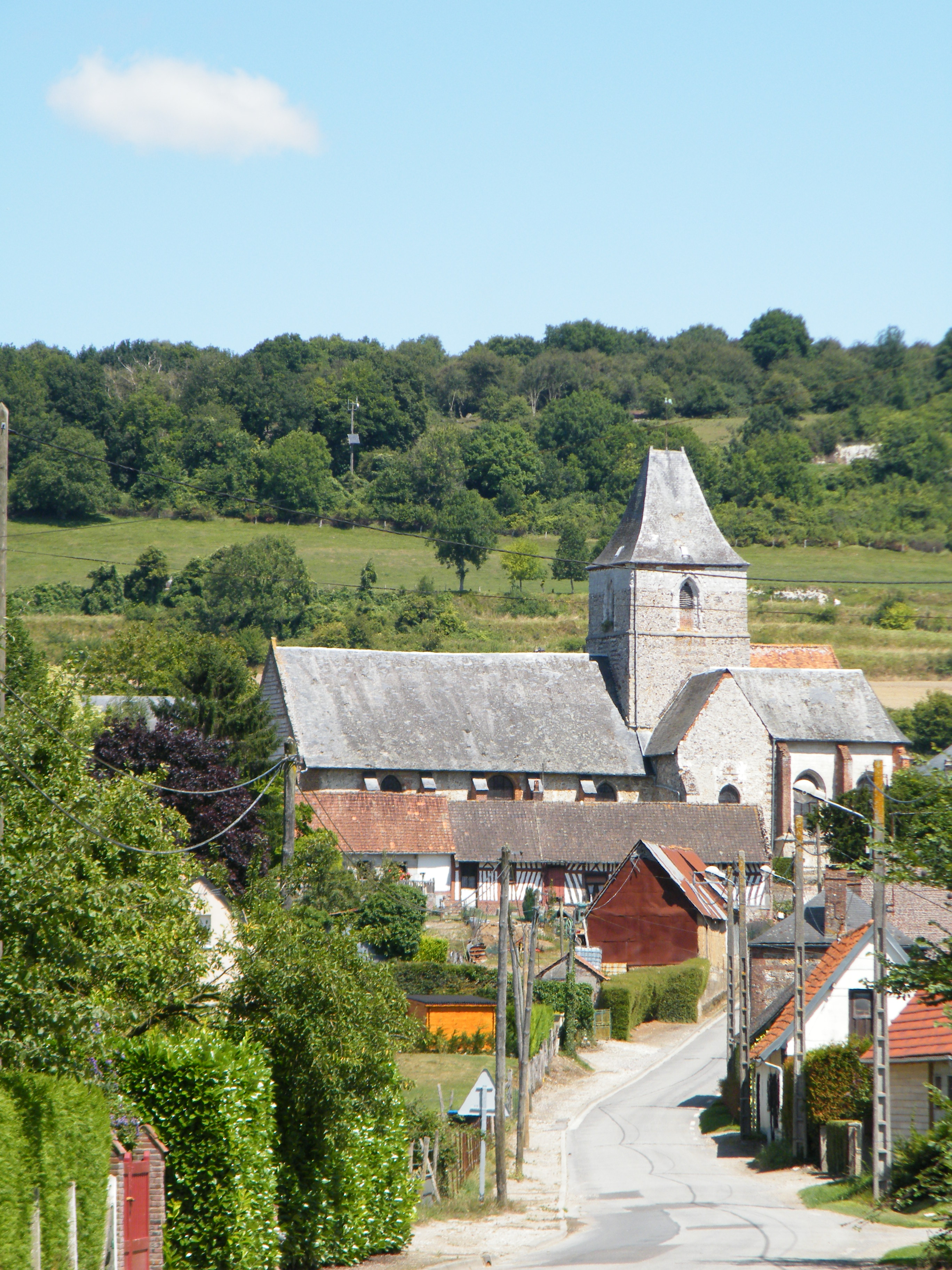
- The church in Douvrend
- Location of Douvrend
- Location within France Location within Normandy
- Coordinates: 49°52′12″N 1°19′25″E
- Country: France
- Region: Normandy
- Department: Seine-Maritime
- Arrondissement: Dieppe
- Canton: Dieppe-2
- Intercommunality: CC Falaises du Talou

Government
  - Mayor (2026–32): Luc Piquet
- Area^{1}: 17.96 km^{2} (6.93 sq mi)
- Elevation: 60 m (200 ft)
- Highest elevation: 186 m (610 ft)
- Lowest elevation: 37 m (121 ft)
- Population (2023): 500
  - Density: 28/km^{2} (72/sq mi)
- Time zone: UTC+01:00 (CET)
  - Summer (DST): UTC+02:00 (CEST)
- INSEE/Postal code: 76220 /76630
- ^{1} French Land Register data, which excludes lakes, ponds, glaciers > 1 km^{2} (0.386 sq mi or 247 acres) and river estuaries.

Douvrend (French pronunciation: [duvʁɑ̃]) is a commune in the Seine-Maritime department in the Normandy region in northern France.

== Geography ==
A farming village situated in the valley of the Eaulne river in the Pays de Caux, some 10 miles (16 km) southeast of Dieppe, at the junction of the D58 and the D920 roads.

== Population ==
Historical population
Year	Pop.	±% p.a.
1968	476	—
1975	461	−0.46%
1982	414	−1.52%
1990	449	+1.02%
1999	465	+0.39%
2007	491	+0.68%
2012	502	+0.44%
2017	522	+0.78%
2023	500	−0.72%
Source: INSEE

== Places of interest ==
- The church of St.Madeleine, dating from the thirteenth century.

== See also ==
- Communes of the Seine-Maritime department
