= Bois-Héroult =

- Commune
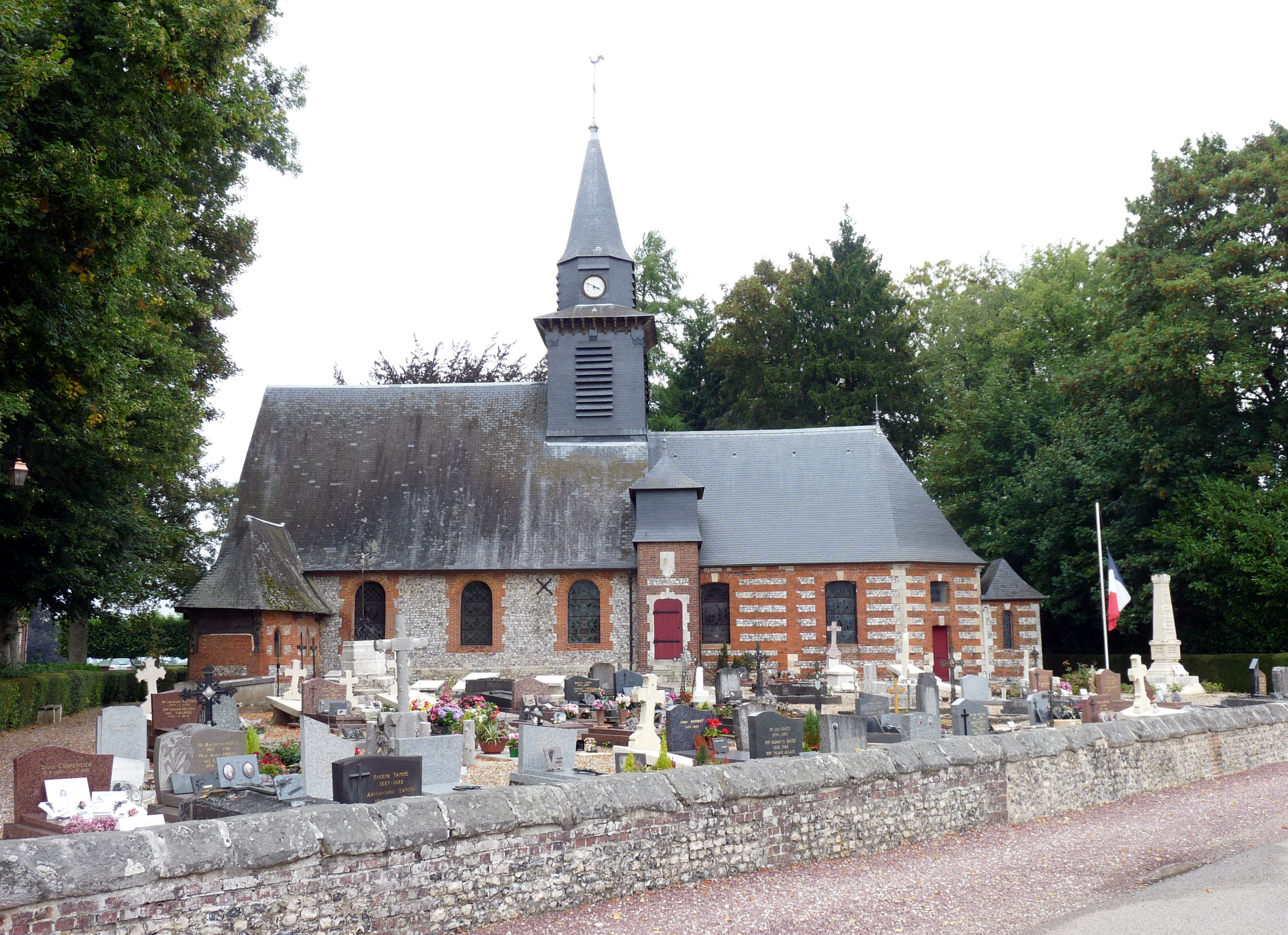
- The church in Bois-Héroult

- Coat of arms
- Location of Bois-Héroult
- Location within France Location within Normandy
- Coordinates: 49°33′48″N 1°24′23″E
- Country: France
- Region: Normandy
- Department: Seine-Maritime
- Arrondissement: Rouen
- Canton: Le Mesnil-Esnard

Government
  - Mayor (2026–32): Édouard de Lamaze
- Area^{1}: 6.59 km^{2} (2.54 sq mi)
- Highest elevation: 232 m (761 ft)
- Lowest elevation: 135 m (443 ft)
- Population (2023): 167
  - Density: 25.3/km^{2} (65.6/sq mi)
- Time zone: UTC+01:00 (CET)
  - Summer (DST): UTC+02:00 (CEST)
- INSEE/Postal code: 76109 /76750
- ^{1} French Land Register data, which excludes lakes, ponds, glaciers > 1 km^{2} (0.386 sq mi or 247 acres) and river estuaries.

Bois-Héroult (in Norman: Bô-Erou) is a commune in the Seine-Maritime département in the Normandy region in northern France.

== Geography ==
A farming village situated in the Pays de Bray, some 16 miles (26 km) northeast of Rouen at the junction of the D61 and the D96 roads.

== Population ==
Historical population
Year	Pop.	±% p.a.
1968	134	—
1975	112	−2.53%
1982	121	+1.11%
1990	130	+0.90%
1999	140	+0.83%
2007	166	+2.15%
2012	178	+1.41%
2017	200	+2.36%
2023	167	−2.96%
Source: INSEE

== Places of interest ==
- The church of Notre-Dame, dating from the sixteenth century.
- The eighteenth-century chateau, with dovecote and a park.

== See also ==
- Communes of the Seine-Maritime department
