= Bellengreville, Seine-Maritime =

Bellengreville
- Commune
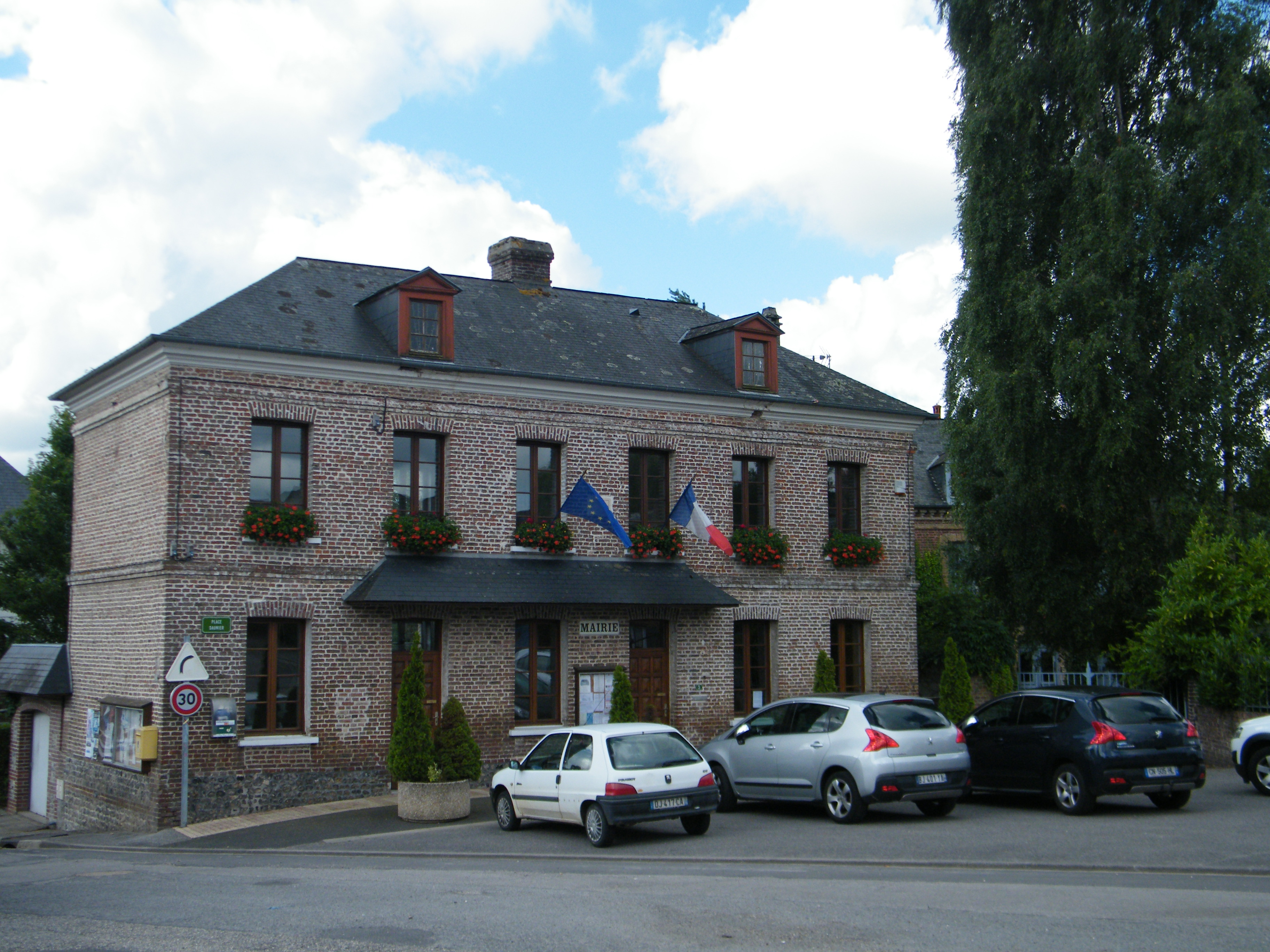
- The town hall in Bellengreville

- Coat of arms
- Location of Bellengreville
- Location within France Location within Normandy
- Coordinates: 49°54′28″N 1°13′01″E
- Country: France
- Region: Normandy
- Department: Seine-Maritime
- Arrondissement: Dieppe
- Canton: Dieppe-2
- Intercommunality: CC Falaises du Talou

Government
  - Mayor (2020–2026): Bruno Gendron
- Area^{1}: 7.67 km^{2} (2.96 sq mi)
- Elevation: 29 m (95 ft)
- Highest elevation: 132 m (433 ft)
- Lowest elevation: 17 m (56 ft)
- Population (2023): 467
  - Density: 60.9/km^{2} (158/sq mi)
- Time zone: UTC+01:00 (CET)
  - Summer (DST): UTC+02:00 (CEST)
- INSEE/Postal code: 76071 /76630
- ^{1} French Land Register data, which excludes lakes, ponds, glaciers > 1 km^{2} (0.386 sq mi or 247 acres) and river estuaries.

Bellengreville (French pronunciation: [bɛlɑ̃ɡʁəvil]) is a commune in the Seine-Maritime department in the Normandy region in north-western France.

== Geography ==
A farming village situated by the banks of the river Eaulne in the Pays de Caux, some 5 miles (8.0 km) southeast of Dieppe, at the junction of the D 920 and the D 256 roads.

== Population ==
Historical population
Year	Pop.	±% p.a.
1968	278	—
1975	313	+1.71%
1982	377	+2.69%
1990	404	+0.87%
1999	397	−0.19%
2007	470	+2.13%
2012	457	−0.56%
2017	476	+0.82%
2023	467	−0.32%
Source: INSEE

== Places of interest ==
- The church of St. Germain, dating from the eighteenth century.
- Remains of a thirteenth-century church at Inerville.
- A ruined sixteenth-century manorhouse.

== See also ==
- Communes of the Seine-Maritime department
