= Saint-Vaast-d'Équiqueville =

- Commune
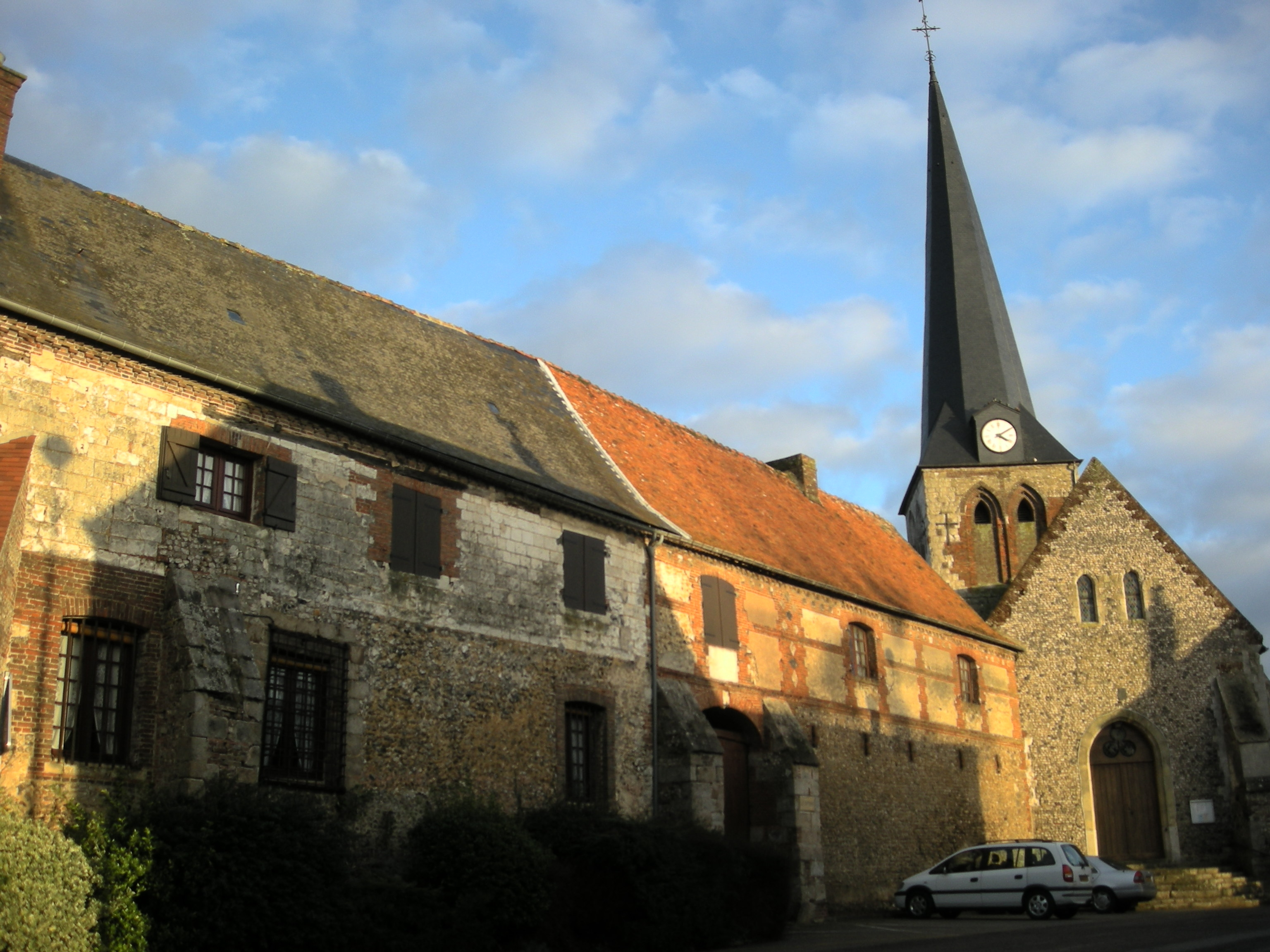
- The church and manorhouse

- Coat of arms
- Location of Saint-Vaast-d'Équiqueville
- Location within France Location within Normandy
- Coordinates: 49°49′06″N 1°15′59″E
- Country: France
- Region: Normandy
- Department: Seine-Maritime
- Arrondissement: Dieppe
- Canton: Dieppe-2
- Intercommunality: CC Falaises du Talou

Government
  - Mayor (2020–2026): Francis Sevestre
- Area^{1}: 14.04 km^{2} (5.42 sq mi)
- Elevation: 39 m (128 ft)
- Highest elevation: 182 m (597 ft)
- Lowest elevation: 30 m (98 ft)
- Population (2023): 748
  - Density: 53.3/km^{2} (138/sq mi)
- Time zone: UTC+01:00 (CET)
  - Summer (DST): UTC+02:00 (CEST)
- INSEE/Postal code: 76652 /76510
- ^{1} French Land Register data, which excludes lakes, ponds, glaciers > 1 km^{2} (0.386 sq mi or 247 acres) and river estuaries.

Saint-Vaast-d'Équiqueville is a commune in the Seine-Maritime department in the Normandy region in north-western France.

== Geography ==
A farming village perched on the banks of the river Béthune in the Pays de Bray, some 12 miles (19 km) southeast of Dieppe at the junction of the D 1, D 22 and the D 14 roads.

== Population ==
Historical population

Year	Pop.	±% p.a.
1793	302	—
1901	470	+0.41%
1962	632	+0.49%
1968	648	+0.42%
1975	552	−2.26%
1982	567	+0.38%

Year	Pop.	±% p.a.
1990	586	+0.41%
1999	562	−0.46%
2007	606	+0.95%
2012	696	+2.81%
2017	750	+1.51%
2023	748	−0.04%

Source: EHESS and INSEE (1968-2023)

== Places of interest ==
- The manorhouse du Doyen (1657)
- The church of St. Vaast, dating from the eleventh century
- A sixteenth-century stone cross

== People ==
- The artist Auguste Durst (1842–1930) stayed here from 1902 to 1907.

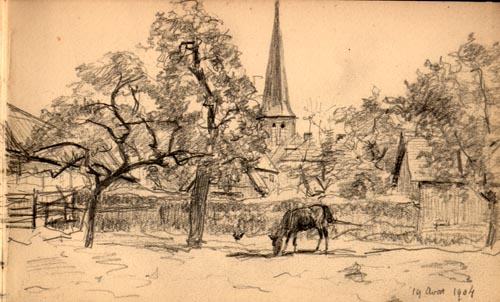
A sketch of the village by Auguste Durst

== See also ==
- Communes of the Seine-Maritime department
