= Envermeu =

- Commune
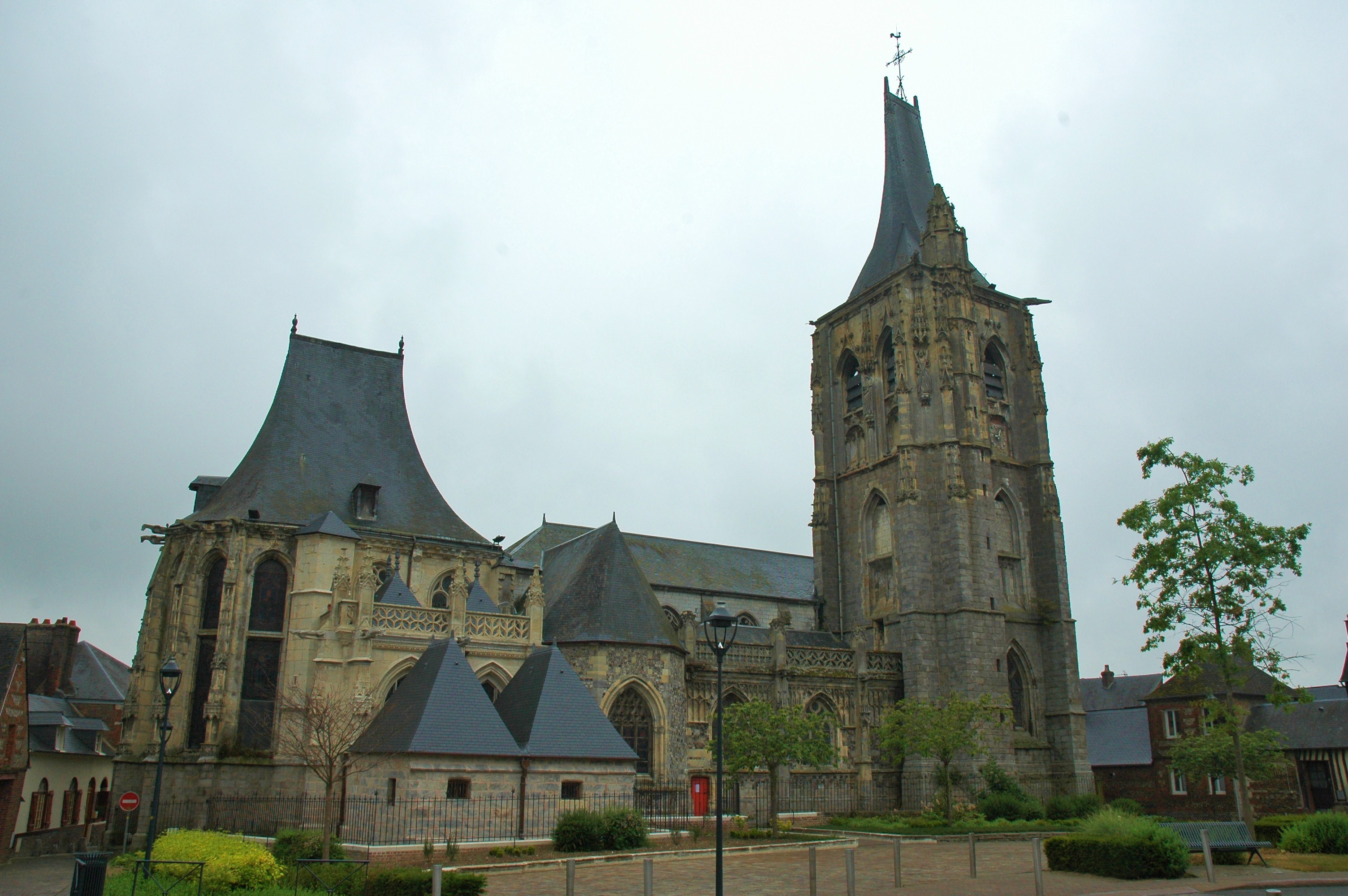
- The church in Envermeu

- Coat of arms
- Location of Envermeu
- Location within France Location within Normandy
- Coordinates: 49°53′49″N 1°15′56″E
- Country: France
- Region: Normandy
- Department: Seine-Maritime
- Arrondissement: Dieppe
- Canton: Dieppe-2
- Intercommunality: CC Falaises du Talou

Government
  - Mayor (2020–2026): Patrick Leroy
- Area^{1}: 14.58 km^{2} (5.63 sq mi)
- Elevation: 43 m (141 ft)
- Highest elevation: 154 m (505 ft)
- Lowest elevation: 24 m (79 ft)
- Population (2023): 1,967
  - Density: 134.9/km^{2} (349.4/sq mi)
- Time zone: UTC+01:00 (CET)
  - Summer (DST): UTC+02:00 (CEST)
- INSEE/Postal code: 76235 /76630
- ^{1} French Land Register data, which excludes lakes, ponds, glaciers > 1 km^{2} (0.386 sq mi or 247 acres) and river estuaries.

Envermeu (French pronunciation: [ɑ̃vɛʁmø]) is a commune in the Seine-Maritime department in the Normandy region in northern France.

== Geography ==
A town of light industry and farming situated in the valley of the Eaulne river, in the Pays de Caux, some 10 miles (16 km) east of Dieppe, at the junction of the D149 and the D920 roads.

== Heraldry ==
Arms of Envermeu	The arms of Envermeu are blazoned : Gules, a leopard Or.

== History ==
Known by various versions of the name over the years, it is first cited as Edremau, around 735–745, then Ebremau and Evremou in 875 then Envremou in the 12th century. The name is derived from the Celtic Eburomagos, based on the terms eburo (wild boar) and magos, a market.
Archaeological excavations have unearthed Gallic gold and some Roman coins found at a place called Le Bucq. Many other relics dating after the fall of the Roman Empire have been found 500 metres (1,600 ft) northeast of the church. Eight hundred graves were brought to light, with 460 skeletons of warriors with their weapons (angons, seax, spatha, etc.), also women adorned with jewelry and other ornaments. There were horses'tombs typical for the Germanic tradition, that is often found in the north of Europe, but quite rarely in France. These tombs demonstrate a Frankish military presence (5th and 6th century), with their families.

During the Merovingian era, after the fall of the Roman Empire, the village became capital of the “Pays de Talou”.
In a charter dated 912, The Norman leader Rollo confirmed his possession of the stronghold of Envermeu.
In 1052, the priory of Saint-Laurent d'Envermeu was founded on the site of a Gallo-Roman villa by Hugh, Lord of Envermeu and his brother Turold. Following the famine and plague that ravaged the region in 1244, Envermeu only numbered 140 homes. The 13th century was also marked by the construction of the chapel at St. Guillain and the foundation, by Michel Taupin and his wife Amelie Guillemette, of the hospital of Saint-Nicolas.
In 1472, the town of Envermeu was burned down by troops of Charles the Bold, Duke of Burgundy.
During the Wars of Religion, Envermeu was looted by Protestants from Dieppe, on 8 July 1562.
In 1589, Henri de Navarre (the future Henri IV) stayed in Envermeu Castle, which was located on the right bank of the Eaulne. In the 18th century, a massive fire destroyed much of the town, which had at that time a population of 1610.
During the Napoleonic Wars and the liberation of France in 1814, Envermeu had to accommodate the British artillery for 3 months.
The commune experienced rapid growth in the 19th century. In 1827, the post office was established. The current town hall was built in 1865. In 1885, the railway line linking Dieppe with Eu was opened. The electrification of the village was completed in 1892. The market hall was built in 1900.
53 soldiers from Envermeu were killed during the First World War. To their memory, a granite monument was commissioned and inaugurated on 23 November 1919.

Envermeu absorbed the hamlets of Hybouville and Saint-Laurent-d'Envermeu in 1822 and Auberville-on-Eaulne in 1843.

== Population ==
Historical population
Year	Pop.	±% p.a.
1968	1,376	—
1975	1,488	+1.12%
1982	1,603	+1.07%
1990	1,960	+2.55%
1999	2,006	+0.26%
2007	2,099	+0.57%
2012	2,144	+0.43%
2017	2,097	−0.44%
2023	1,967	−1.06%
Source: INSEE

== Places of interest ==
- The church of Notre-Dame, dating from the sixteenth century.
- A feudal motte at a place called ”le Câtel”, by the river.
- The Château d'Hibouville, dating from the sixteenth century.
- The Château d'Auberville, now a farm.
- A thirteenth-century chapel.

== Notable people ==
- Pierre Laffillé, French artist, was born here.

== See also ==
- Communes of the Seine-Maritime department
