= Saint-Jacques-d'Aliermont =

- Commune
- Location of Saint-Jacques-d'Aliermont
- Location within France Location within Normandy
- Coordinates: 49°50′57″N 1°15′32″E
- Country: France
- Region: Normandy
- Department: Seine-Maritime
- Arrondissement: Dieppe
- Canton: Dieppe-2
- Intercommunality: CC Falaises du Talou

Government
  - Mayor (2026–32): Jean-Marie Follain
- Area^{1}: 7.86 km^{2} (3.03 sq mi)
- Elevation: 162 m (531 ft)
- Highest elevation: 178 m (584 ft)
- Lowest elevation: 46 m (151 ft)
- Population (2023): 373
  - Density: 47.5/km^{2} (123/sq mi)
- Time zone: UTC+01:00 (CET)
  - Summer (DST): UTC+02:00 (CEST)
- INSEE/Postal code: 76590 /76510
- ^{1} French Land Register data, which excludes lakes, ponds, glaciers > 1 km^{2} (0.386 sq mi or 247 acres) and river estuaries.

Saint-Jacques-d'Aliermont (French pronunciation: [sɛ̃ ʒak daljɛʁmɔ̃]) is a commune in the Seine-Maritime department in the Normandy region in northern France.

== Geography ==
A farming village situated in the Pays de Caux, at the junction of the D201 and the D222 roads, some 9 miles (14 km) southeast of Dieppe.

== Population ==
Historical population
Year	Pop.	±% p.a.
1968	259	—
1975	228	−1.80%
1982	271	+2.50%
1990	319	+2.06%
1999	325	+0.21%
2007	356	+1.15%
2012	367	+0.61%
2017	349	−1.00%
2023	373	+1.11%
Source: INSEE

== Places of interest ==
- The church of St.Jacques, dating from the nineteenth century.

== See also ==
- Communes of the Seine-Maritime department
