= Les Ifs =

- Commune
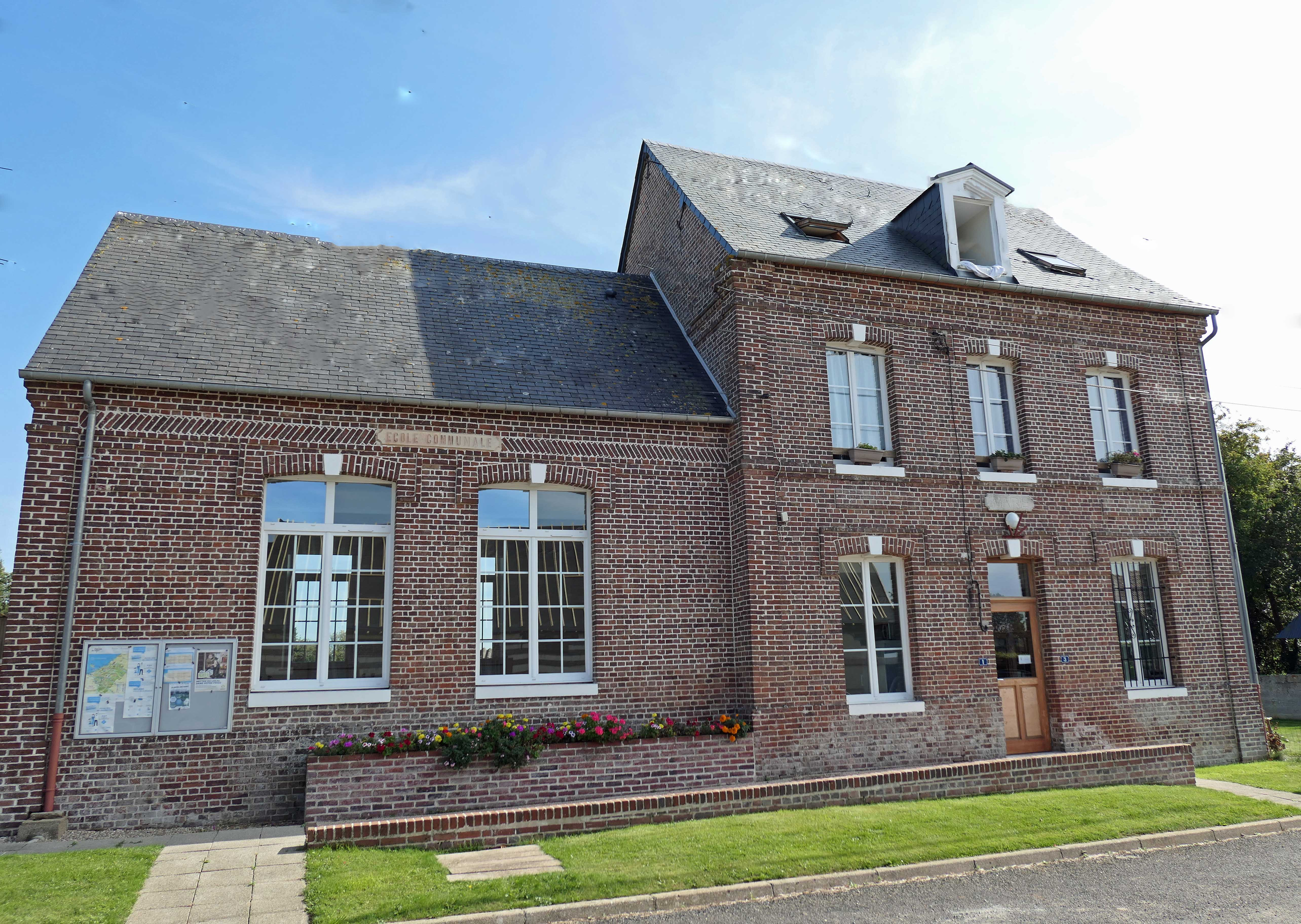
- Les Ifs Town hall
- Location of Les Ifs
- Location within France Location within Normandy
- Coordinates: 49°53′08″N 1°23′46″E
- Country: France
- Region: Normandy
- Department: Seine-Maritime
- Arrondissement: Dieppe
- Canton: Dieppe-2
- Intercommunality: CC Falaises du Talou

Government
  - Mayor (2026–32): Sylvie Dubuc
- Area^{1}: 4.03 km^{2} (1.56 sq mi)
- Elevation: 180 m (590 ft)
- Highest elevation: 186 m (610 ft)
- Lowest elevation: 135 m (443 ft)
- Population (2023): 67
  - Density: 17/km^{2} (43/sq mi)
- Time zone: UTC+01:00 (CET)
  - Summer (DST): UTC+02:00 (CEST)
- INSEE/Postal code: 76371 /76630
- ^{1} French Land Register data, which excludes lakes, ponds, glaciers > 1 km^{2} (0.386 sq mi or 247 acres) and river estuaries.

Les Ifs is a commune in the Seine-Maritime department in the Normandy region in northern France.

== Geography ==
A tiny farming village situated in the Pays de Caux, some 16 miles (26 km) east of Dieppe just off the D115 road.

== Population ==
Historical population
Year	Pop.	±% p.a.
1968	73	—
1975	68	−1.01%
1982	53	−3.50%
1990	44	−2.30%
1999	43	−0.26%
2007	49	+1.65%
2012	60	+4.13%
2017	75	+4.56%
2023	67	−1.86%
Source: INSEE

== Places of interest ==
- The church of St. Barthélemy, dating from the eighteenth century.

== See also ==
- Communes of the Seine-Maritime department
