= Dampierre-Saint-Nicolas =

- Commune
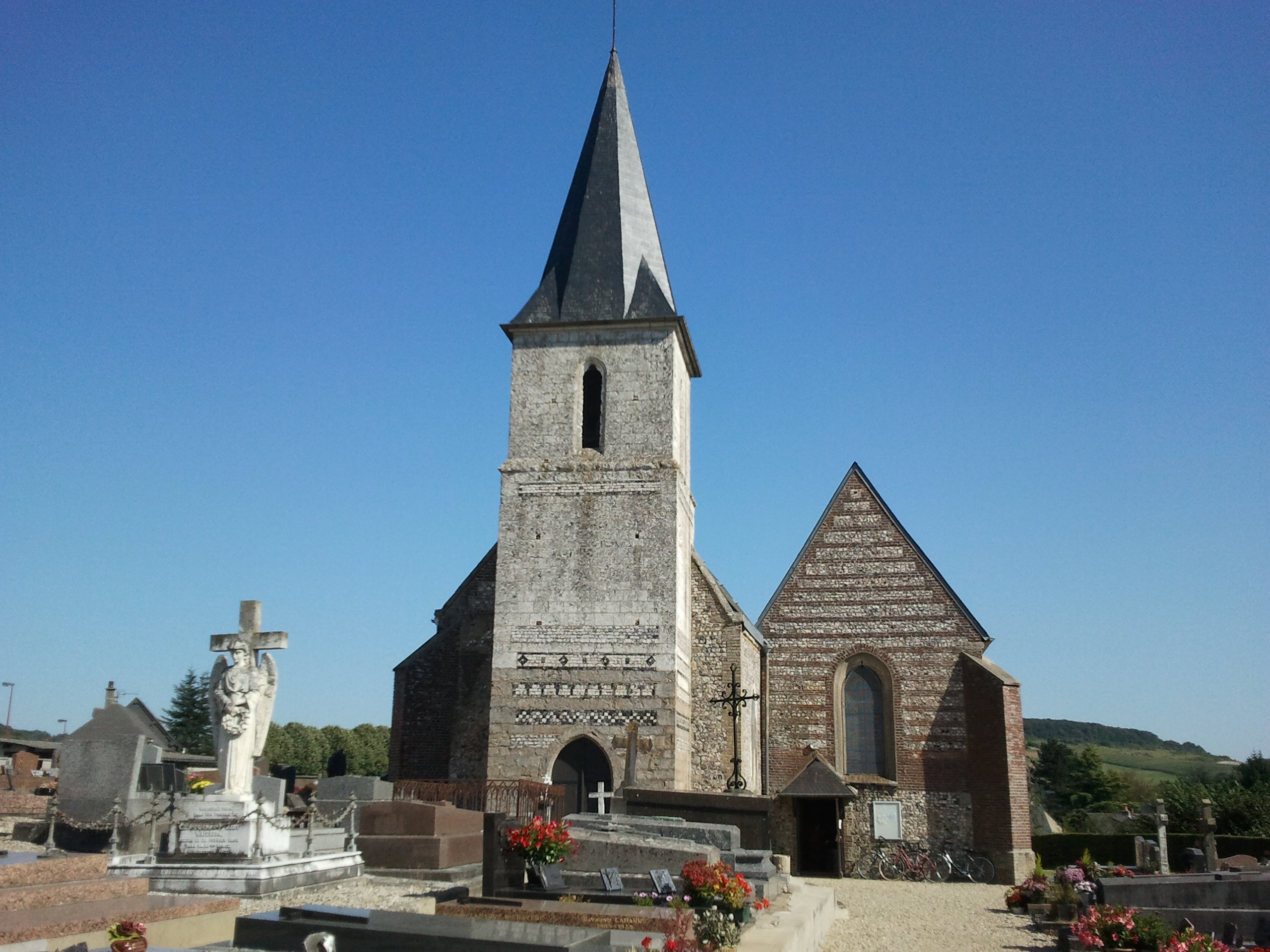
- The church in Dampierre-Saint-Nicolas

- Coat of arms
- Location of Dampierre-Saint-Nicolas
- Location within France Location within Normandy
- Coordinates: 49°51′37″N 1°12′03″E
- Country: France
- Region: Normandy
- Department: Seine-Maritime
- Arrondissement: Dieppe
- Canton: Dieppe-2
- Intercommunality: CC Falaises du Talou

Government
  - Mayor (2026–32): Bernard Tomkow
- Area^{1}: 3.94 km^{2} (1.52 sq mi)
- Elevation: 15 m (49 ft)
- Highest elevation: 136 m (446 ft)
- Lowest elevation: 14 m (46 ft)
- Population (2023): 444
  - Density: 113/km^{2} (292/sq mi)
- Time zone: UTC+01:00 (CET)
  - Summer (DST): UTC+02:00 (CEST)
- INSEE/Postal code: 76210 /76510
- ^{1} French Land Register data, which excludes lakes, ponds, glaciers > 1 km^{2} (0.386 sq mi or 247 acres) and river estuaries.

Dampierre-Saint-Nicolas (French pronunciation: [dɑ̃pjɛʁ sɛ̃ nikɔla]) is a commune in the Seine-Maritime department in the Normandy region in northern France.

== Geography ==
A farming village situated by the banks of the river Béthune in the Pays de Caux, some 5 miles (8.0 km) southeast of Dieppe, at the junction of the D1 and the D114 roads.

== Population ==
Historical population
Year	Pop.	±% p.a.
1968	396	—
1975	509	+3.65%
1982	510	+0.03%
1990	515	+0.12%
1999	483	−0.71%
2007	514	+0.78%
2012	523	+0.35%
2017	472	−2.03%
2023	444	−1.01%
Source: INSEE

== Places of interest ==
- The church of St.Pierre & St.Paul, dating from the thirteenth century.
- Remains of a 19th-century chateau.
- A seventeenth-century manorhouse.

== See also ==
- Communes of the Seine-Maritime department
