= Saint-Nicolas-d'Aliermont =

- Commune
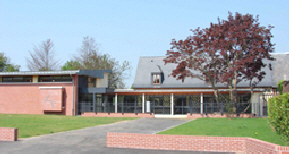
- The museum of horology in Saint-Nicolas-d'Aliermont

- Coat of arms
- Location of Saint-Nicolas-d'Aliermont
- Location within France Location within Normandy
- Coordinates: 49°52′48″N 1°13′16″E
- Country: France
- Region: Normandy
- Department: Seine-Maritime
- Arrondissement: Dieppe
- Canton: Dieppe-2
- Intercommunality: CC Falaises du Talou

Government
  - Mayor (2020–2026): Blandine Lefebvre
- Area^{1}: 15.53 km^{2} (6.00 sq mi)
- Elevation: 132 m (433 ft)
- Highest elevation: 164 m (538 ft)
- Lowest elevation: 40 m (130 ft)
- Population (2023): 3,665
  - Density: 236.0/km^{2} (611.2/sq mi)
- Time zone: UTC+01:00 (CET)
  - Summer (DST): UTC+02:00 (CEST)
- INSEE/Postal code: 76624 /76510
- ^{1} French Land Register data, which excludes lakes, ponds, glaciers > 1 km^{2} (0.386 sq mi or 247 acres) and river estuaries.

Saint-Nicolas-d'Aliermont (French pronunciation: [sɛ̃ nikɔla daljɛʁmɔ̃]) is a commune in the Seine-Maritime department in the Normandy region in north-western France.

== Geography ==
A small town of farming and light industry situated in the Pays de Bray, at the junction of the D149, the D256 and the D56 roads, some 9 miles (14 km) southeast of Dieppe.

== Heraldry ==
Arms of Saint-Nicolas-d'Aliermont	The arms of Saint-Nicolas-d'Aliermont are blazoned : Gules, an episcopal crozier argent between an hourglass and a toothed wheel of 8 spokes Or.

== Population ==
Historical population
Year	Pop.	±% p.a.
1968	3,216	—
1975	3,614	+1.68%
1982	3,964	+1.33%
1990	4,055	+0.28%
1999	3,862	−0.54%
2007	3,717	−0.48%
2012	3,648	−0.37%
2017	3,705	+0.31%
2023	3,665	−0.18%
Source: INSEE

== Places of interest ==
- The church of St. Nicolas, dating from the thirteenth century.
- The horology museum.

== See also ==
- Communes of the Seine-Maritime department
