= Sauchay =

- Commune
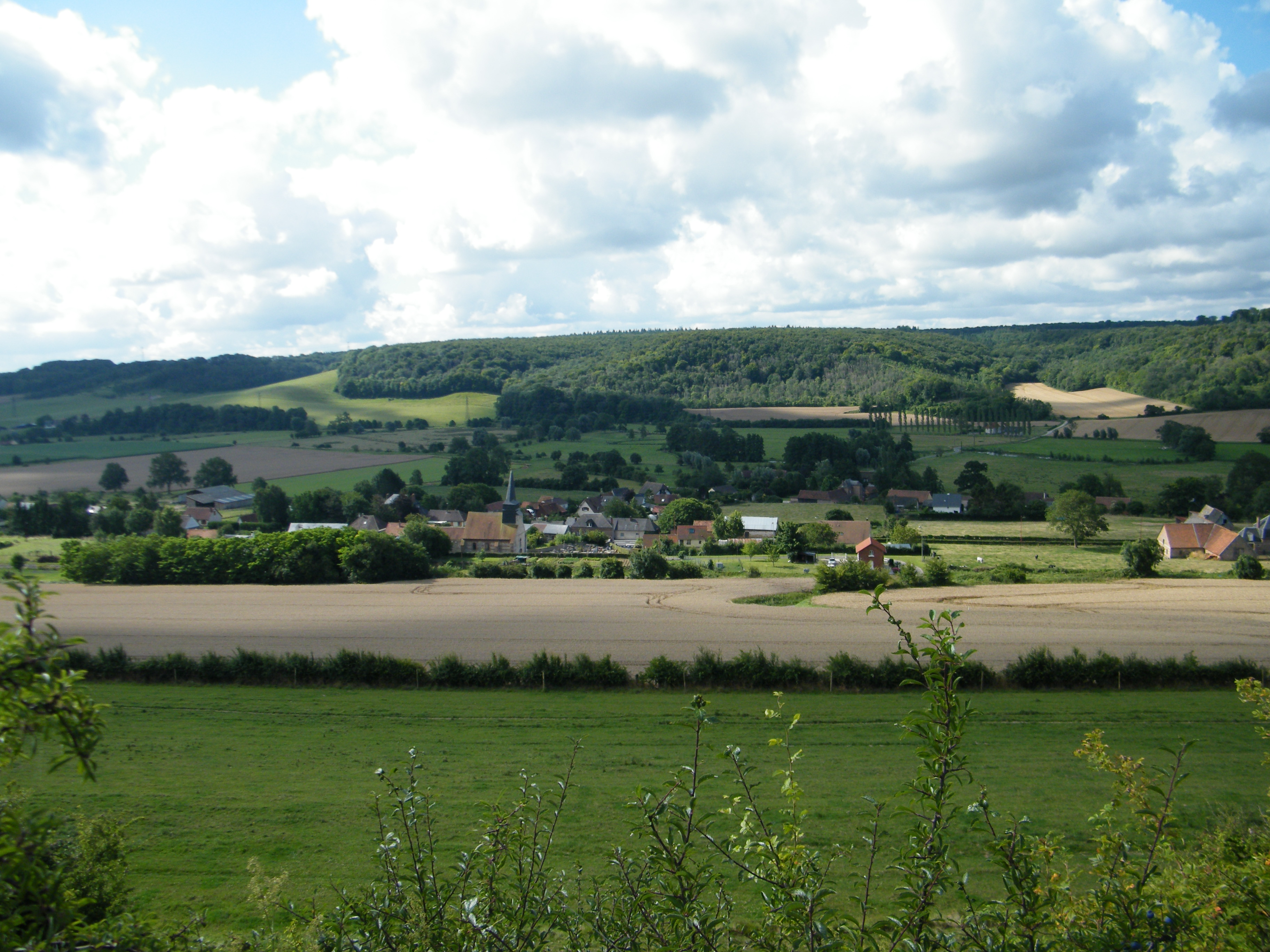
- A general view of Sauchay

- Coat of arms
- Location of Sauchay
- Location within France Location within Normandy
- Coordinates: 49°55′24″N 1°12′09″E
- Country: France
- Region: Normandy
- Department: Seine-Maritime
- Arrondissement: Dieppe
- Canton: Dieppe-2
- Intercommunality: CC Falaises du Talou

Government
  - Mayor (2026–32): Gérard Larcheveque
- Area^{1}: 5.74 km^{2} (2.22 sq mi)
- Elevation: 35 m (115 ft)
- Highest elevation: 114 m (374 ft)
- Lowest elevation: 15 m (49 ft)
- Population (2023): 454
  - Density: 79.1/km^{2} (205/sq mi)
- Time zone: UTC+01:00 (CET)
  - Summer (DST): UTC+02:00 (CEST)
- INSEE/Postal code: 76665 /76630
- ^{1} French Land Register data, which excludes lakes, ponds, glaciers > 1 km^{2} (0.386 sq mi or 247 acres) and river estuaries.

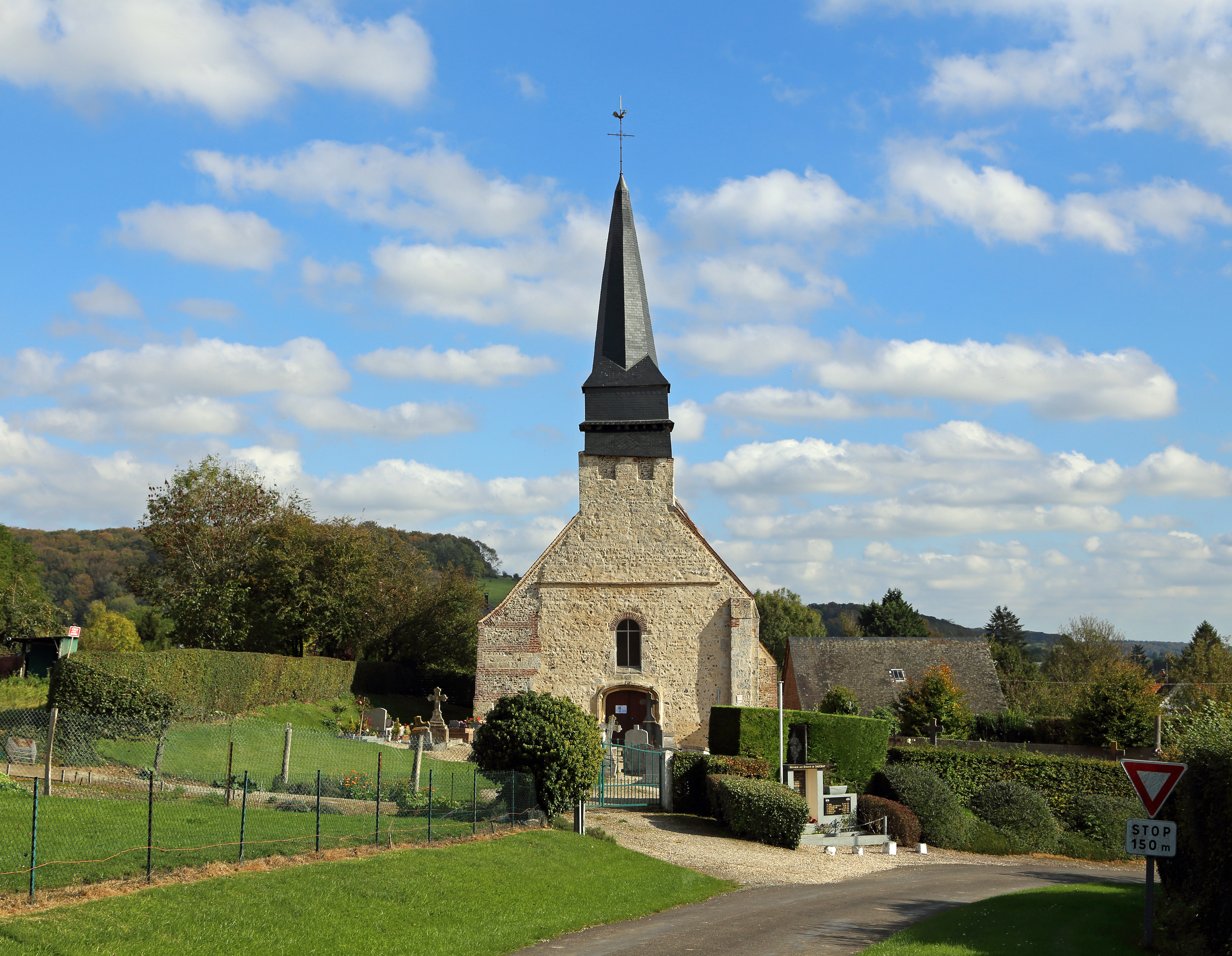
St Martial church of Sauchay-le-Bas

Sauchay (French pronunciation: [soʃɛ]) is a commune in the Seine-Maritime department in the Normandy region in northern France.

== Geography ==
It comprises two farming villages situated in the valley of the Eaulne river in the Pays de Caux, some 5 miles (8.0 km) east of Dieppe on the D920 and D454 roads.

== Population ==
Historical population
Year	Pop.	±% p.a.
1968	332	—
1975	314	−0.79%
1982	374	+2.53%
1990	431	+1.79%
1999	392	−1.05%
2007	405	+0.41%
2012	410	+0.25%
2017	415	+0.24%
2023	454	+1.51%
Source: INSEE

== Places of interest ==
- A château and its gardens.
- The church of Notre-Dame, dating from the sixteenth century.
- The church of St. Martial at Sauchay-le-Bas, dating from the eleventh century.
- A sixteenth-century stone cross.

== See also ==
- Communes of the Seine-Maritime department
