= Saint-Aubin-le-Cauf =

- Commune
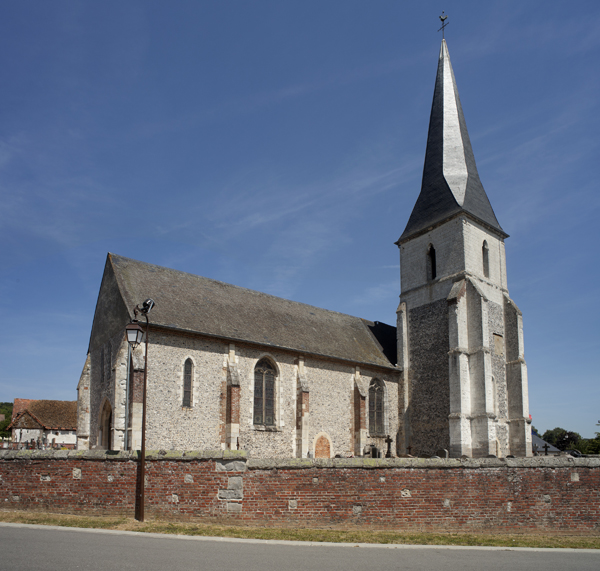
- The church in Saint-Aubin-le-Cauf

- Coat of arms
- Location of Saint-Aubin-le-Cauf
- Location within France Location within Normandy
- Coordinates: 49°52′11″N 1°10′51″E
- Country: France
- Region: Normandy
- Department: Seine-Maritime
- Arrondissement: Dieppe
- Canton: Dieppe-2
- Intercommunality: CC Falaises du Talou

Government
  - Mayor (2026–32): Christophe Dequesne
- Area^{1}: 10.11 km^{2} (3.90 sq mi)
- Elevation: 24 m (79 ft)
- Highest elevation: 133 m (436 ft)
- Lowest elevation: 4 m (13 ft)
- Population (2023): 843
  - Density: 83.4/km^{2} (216/sq mi)
- Time zone: UTC+01:00 (CET)
  - Summer (DST): UTC+02:00 (CEST)
- INSEE/Postal code: 76562 /76510
- ^{1} French Land Register data, which excludes lakes, ponds, glaciers > 1 km^{2} (0.386 sq mi or 247 acres) and river estuaries.

Saint-Aubin-le-Cauf (French pronunciation: [sɛ̃.t‿obɛ̃ lə kof]) is a commune in the Seine-Maritime department in the Normandy region in northern France.

== Geography ==
A village of farming and lakes, situated by the banks of the rivers Bethune and Varenne in the Pays de Bray at the junction of the D1 and the D149 roads, some 7 miles (11 km) southeast of Dieppe.

== Population ==
Historical population
Year	Pop.	±% p.a.
1968	534	—
1975	563	+0.76%
1982	672	+2.56%
1990	747	+1.33%
1999	747	+0.00%
2007	860	+1.78%
2012	926	+1.49%
2017	853	−1.63%
2023	843	−0.20%
Source: INSEE

== Places of interest ==
- The church of St. Aubin, dating from the thirteenth century.
- Some fifteenth- and sixteenth-century houses.
- La Chatellenie = 18th century demeure former house of Alexander Alekhine now a 4 star Guesthouse.

== See also ==
- Communes of the Seine-Maritime department
