= Notre-Dame-d'Aliermont =

- Commune
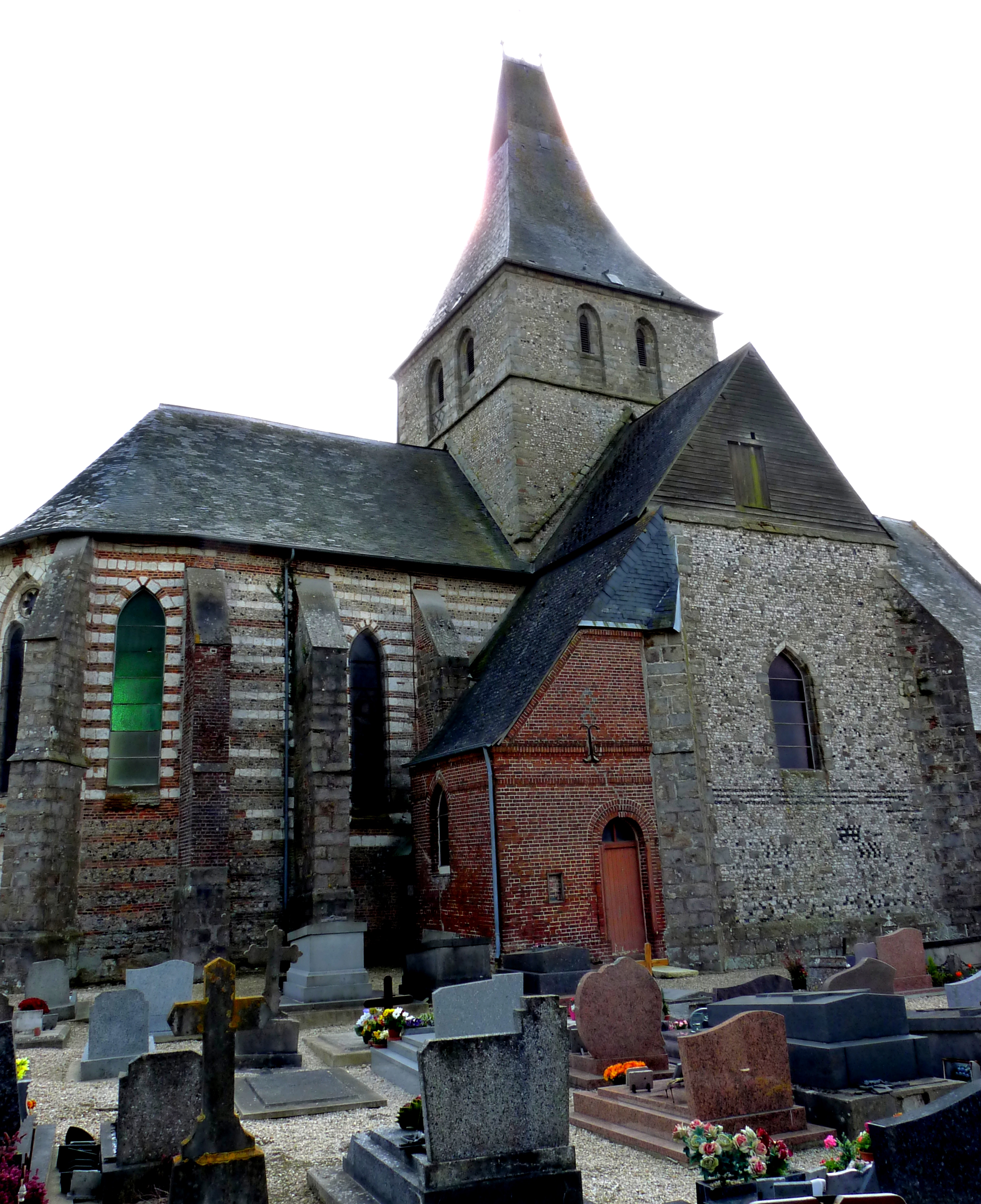
- The church in Notre-Dame-d'Aliermont
- Location of Notre-Dame-d'Aliermont
- Location within France Location within Normandy
- Coordinates: 49°51′11″N 1°17′30″E
- Country: France
- Region: Normandy
- Department: Seine-Maritime
- Arrondissement: Dieppe
- Canton: Dieppe-2
- Intercommunality: CC Falaises du Talou

Government
  - Mayor (2026–32): Christophe Fromentin
- Area^{1}: 13.31 km^{2} (5.14 sq mi)
- Elevation: 160 m (520 ft)
- Highest elevation: 196 m (643 ft)
- Lowest elevation: 94 m (308 ft)
- Population (2023): 701
  - Density: 52.7/km^{2} (136/sq mi)
- Time zone: UTC+01:00 (CET)
  - Summer (DST): UTC+02:00 (CEST)
- INSEE/Postal code: 76472 /76510
- ^{1} French Land Register data, which excludes lakes, ponds, glaciers > 1 km^{2} (0.386 sq mi or 247 acres) and river estuaries.

Notre-Dame-d'Aliermont (French pronunciation: [nɔtʁə dam daljɛʁmɔ̃]) is a commune in the Seine-Maritime department in the Normandy region in northern France.

== Geography ==
A farming village situated in the Pays de Caux at the junction of the D22 and the D56 roads, some 10 miles (16 km) southeast of Dieppe.

== Population ==
Historical population
Year	Pop.	±% p.a.
1968	395	—
1975	441	+1.59%
1982	486	+1.40%
1990	525	+0.97%
1999	538	+0.27%
2007	621	+1.81%
2012	715	+2.86%
2017	771	+1.52%
2023	701	−1.57%
Source: INSEE

== Places of interest ==
- The church of Notre-Dame, dating from the thirteenth century.

== See also ==
- Communes of the Seine-Maritime department
