= Bailly-en-Rivière =

- Commune
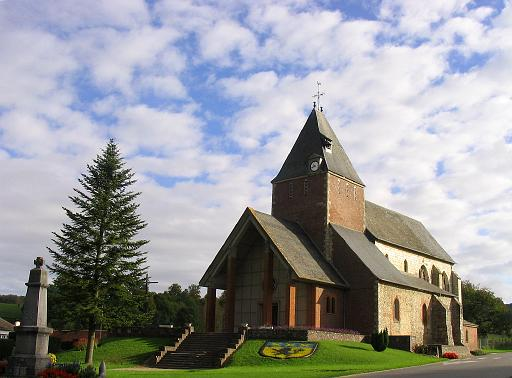
- The church in Bailly-en-Rivière

- Coat of arms
- Location of Bailly-en-Rivière
- Location within France Location within Normandy
- Coordinates: 49°54′47″N 1°20′13″E
- Country: France
- Region: Normandy
- Department: Seine-Maritime
- Arrondissement: Dieppe
- Canton: Dieppe-2
- Intercommunality: CC Falaises du Talou

Government
  - Mayor (2020–2026): Serge Gisselère
- Area^{1}: 20.06 km^{2} (7.75 sq mi)
- Elevation: 76 m (249 ft)
- Highest elevation: 177 m (581 ft)
- Lowest elevation: 62 m (203 ft)
- Population (2023): 510
  - Density: 25/km^{2} (66/sq mi)
- Time zone: UTC+01:00 (CET)
  - Summer (DST): UTC+02:00 (CEST)
- INSEE/Postal code: 76054 /76630
- ^{1} French Land Register data, which excludes lakes, ponds, glaciers > 1 km^{2} (0.386 sq mi or 247 acres) and river estuaries.

Bailly-en-Rivière (French pronunciation: [baji ɑ̃ ʁivjɛʁ]) is a commune in the Seine-Maritime department in the Normandy region in northern France.

== Geography ==
A forestry and farming village in the valley of the small Bailly-Bec river, in the Pays de Caux, situated some 13 miles (21 km) east of Dieppe, at the junction of the D58, D117 and D149 roads.

== Heraldry ==
Arms of Bailly-en-Rivière	The arms of Bailly-en-Rivière are blazoned : Or, a lion crowned, and on a chief gules 3 saltires couped Or.

== Population ==
Historical population
Year	Pop.	±% p.a.
1968	534	—
1975	521	−0.35%
1982	524	+0.08%
1990	505	−0.46%
1999	498	−0.15%
2007	560	+1.48%
2012	532	−1.02%
2017	526	−0.23%
2023	510	−0.51%
Source: INSEE

== Places of interest ==
- The church of St.Martin, dating from the twelfth century.
- Vestiges of a feudal castle.
- Château de Montigny.

== Twin towns ==
- Herstal (Milmort village), in Belgium since 1973.

== See also ==
- Communes of the Seine-Maritime department
