= Avesnes-en-Val =

- Commune
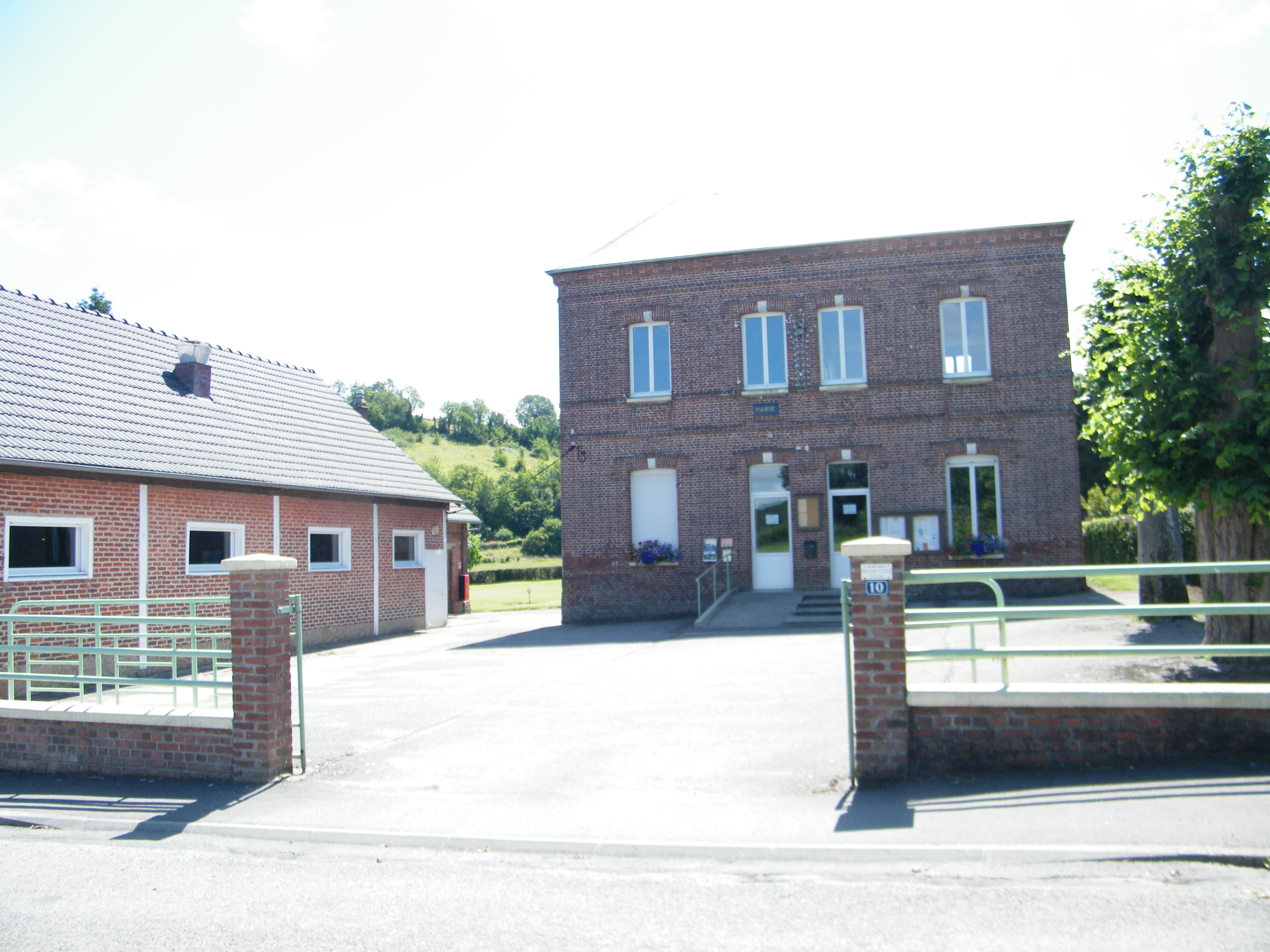
- The town hall in Avesnes-en-Val
- Location of Avesnes-en-Val
- Location within France Location within Normandy
- Coordinates: 49°55′16″N 1°23′53″E
- Country: France
- Region: Normandy
- Department: Seine-Maritime
- Arrondissement: Dieppe
- Canton: Neufchâtel-en-Bray
- Intercommunality: CC Falaises Talou

Government
  - Mayor (2026–32): Catherine Flamand
- Area^{1}: 16.51 km^{2} (6.37 sq mi)
- Elevation: 160 m (520 ft)
- Highest elevation: 184 m (604 ft)
- Lowest elevation: 79 m (259 ft)
- Population (2023): 261
  - Density: 15.8/km^{2} (40.9/sq mi)
- Time zone: UTC+01:00 (CET)
  - Summer (DST): UTC+02:00 (CEST)
- INSEE/Postal code: 76049 /76630
- ^{1} French Land Register data, which excludes lakes, ponds, glaciers > 1 km^{2} (0.386 sq mi or 247 acres) and river estuaries.

Avesnes-en-Val (French pronunciation: [avɛn ɑ̃ val]) is a commune in the Seine-Maritime department in the Normandy region in northern France.

== Geography ==
A small farming commune comprising the village itself and seven hamlets, in the Pays de Bray, situated some 17 miles (27 km) east of Dieppe, at the junction of the D26 and D226 roads.

== Population ==
Historical population
Year	Pop.	±% p.a.
1968	406	—
1975	372	−1.24%
1982	307	−2.71%
1990	291	−0.67%
1999	268	−0.91%
2007	281	+0.59%
2012	264	−1.24%
2017	279	+1.11%
2023	261	−1.11%
Source: INSEE

== Places of interest ==
- The sixteenth century church of St. Aignan.
- The church of Saint-Melaine dating from the sixteenth century.
- The sixteenth century church of Notre-Dame at Villy-le-Haut.

== See also ==
- Communes of the Seine-Maritime department
