= Béthune (river) =

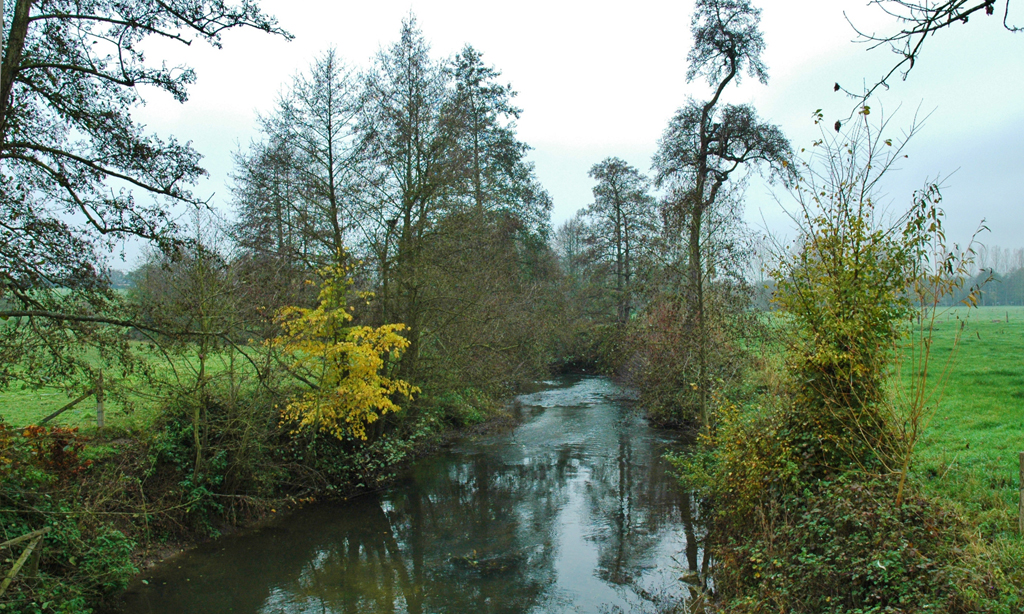

Location
- Country: France
- Region: Normandy

Physical characteristics
- Source
  - location: Gaillefontaine
  - elevation: 160 m (520 ft)
- Mouth
  - location: Arques
  - coordinates: 49°53′29″N 1°7′51″E
- Length: 61 km (38 mi)
- Basin size: 307 km^{2} (119 sq mi)
- Discharge
  - average: 2.9 m^{3}/s (100 cu ft/s)

Basin features
- Progression: Arques→ English Channel

The Béthune (French pronunciation: [betyn]) is a river of Normandy, France, 61 kilometres (38 mi) in length, flowing through the department of Seine-Maritime and it is a tributary of the Arques. However, Sandre, the regulators of France's national Water Information System, consider the Béthune to be the upper part of the Arques.

== Geography ==
Arques and Béthune drainage basin

The river's source is at the village of Gaillefontaine near to Forges-les-Eaux. Its valley is wholly within the pays de Bray. Its course takes it past the communes of Neufchâtel-en-Bray, Mesnières-en-Bray, Bures-en-Bray, Osmoy-Saint-Valery, Saint-Vaast-d'Équiqueville, Dampierre-Saint-Nicolas, Saint-Aubin-le-Cauf and finally Arques-la-Bataille where it joins the rivers Eaulne and Varenne to form the Arques.

Like other rivers in the region, the Béthune is classified as a first class river, offering anglers the chance to catch salmon and trout.

== See also ==
- French water management scheme
