= Communauté de communes du Petit Caux =

Coordinates: 49.9567°N 1.2234°E

Petit Caux
- Former communauté de communes
- Interactive map of Petit Caux
- Country: France
- Region: Normandy
- Department: Seine-Maritime
- No. of communes: {{{nbcomm}}}
- Established: 2002
- Disbanded: 2016

The former Communauté de communes du Petit Caux was located in the Seine-Maritime département of the Normandy region of north-western France. It was created in January 2002. It was disbanded on 1 January 2016 when its member communes merged into the new commune Petit-Caux.

== Participants ==
The Communauté de communes comprised the following communes:

- Assigny
- Auquemesnil
- Belleville-sur-Mer
- Berneval-le-Grand
- Biville-sur-Mer
- Bracquemont
- Brunville
- Derchigny
- Glicourt
- Gouchaupre
- Greny
- Guilmécourt
- Intraville
- Penly
- Saint-Martin-en-Campagne
- Saint-Quentin-au-Bosc
- Tocqueville-sur-Eu
- Tourville-la-Chapelle

== See also ==
- Communes of the Seine-Maritime department
