= Canton of Dieppe-Est =

Coordinates: 49°55′51″N 1°09′25″E

Dieppe-Est
- Former canton
- Interactive map of Dieppe-Est
- Country: France
- Region: Normandy
- Department: Seine-Maritime
- No. of communes: {{{nbcomm}}}
- Disbanded: 2015
- Area: 192.23 km^{2} (74.22 sq mi)
- Population (2012): 18,293
  - Density: 95.162/km^{2} (246.47/sq mi)

The Canton of Dieppe-Est is a former canton situated in the Seine-Maritime département and in the Haute-Normandie region of northern France. It was disbanded following the French canton reorganisation which came into effect in March 2015. It consisted of 8 communes, which joined the canton of Dieppe-2 in 2015. It had a total of 18,293 inhabitants (2012).

== Geography ==
A farming, light industry and fishing area in the arrondissement of Dieppe, centred on the port and town of Dieppe.

The canton comprised 8 communes:

- Ancourt
- Belleville-sur-Mer
- Berneval-le-Grand
- Bracquemont
- Derchigny
- Dieppe (partly)
- Grèges
- Martin-Église

== Population ==
Historical population
Year	Pop.	±%
1990	19,336	—
1999	19,555	+1.1%
2012	18,293	−6.5%

== See also ==
- Arrondissements of the Seine-Maritime department
- Cantons of the Seine-Maritime department
- Communes of the Seine-Maritime department
