= Assigny =

Assigny may refer to:

== Places ==
- Assigny, Cher, a commune in the department of Cher
- Assigny, Seine-Maritime, a commune in the department of Seine-Maritime

== People ==
- Félix-Ariel d'Assigny, a French navy officer
