= Tocqueville (disambiguation) =

Alexis de Tocqueville (1805–1859) was a French political thinker and historian.

Tocqueville may also refer to:

== Places in France ==
- Tocqueville, Eure, a commune
- Tocqueville, Manche, a commune
- Tocqueville-en-Caux, Seine-Maritime, a commune
- Tocqueville-les-Murs, Seine-Maritime, a commune
- Tocqueville-sur-Eu, Seine-Maritime, a former commune

== Other uses ==
- Alexis de Tocqueville Institution, an American conservative think tank
- Hippolyte Clérel de Tocqueville, senator of the French Third Republic
