= List of shipwrecks in April 1826 =

The list of shipwrecks in April 1826 includes some ships sunk, foundered, grounded, or otherwise lost during April 1826.

== 1 April ==
List of shipwrecks: 1 April 1826
Ship	State	Description
Rosenbaum	Hamburg	The ship was driven ashore at Memel, Prussia. She was on a voyage from Hamburg to Memel.
Union	United Kingdom	The ship was captured off "St. Andrew's", Africa. Her crew were murdered and the ship was run onto rocks and wrecked.

== 2 April ==
List of shipwrecks: 2 April 1826
Ship	State	Description
Anna Elizabeth	Sweden	The ship was driven ashore and wrecked at Saint-Quentin-au-Bosc, Seine-Inférieure, France. Her crew were rescued. She was on a voyage from Gothenburg to Havre de Grâce, Seine-Inférieure.
Lively	United Kingdom	The schooner was driven ashore in Bighouse Bay, where she was wrecked on 5 April. Her crew were rescued. She was on a voyage from Easdale, Argyllshire to Aberdeen.
Triad	United Kingdom	The ship struck a rock off Tynemouth Castle, County Durham. She subsequently came ashore at Cullercoats, County Durham and was damaged with the loss of a crew member. Triad was on a voyage from Hamburg to South Shields, County Durham. She was refloated on 8 April and taken in to North Shields in a waterlogged condition.

== 7 April ==
List of shipwrecks: 7 April 1826
Ship	State	Description
Emanuel	Netherlands	The ship ran aground at Beachy Head, Sussex, United Kingdom. Her crew were rescued. She was on a voyage from Surinam to Amsterdam, North Holland . Emanuel was refloated on 10 April and beached at Cooden, Sussex, where she was wrecked on 12 April.
Goodintent	United Kingdom	The ship was in collision with Janet (United Kingdom) and sank in the North Sea with the loss of a crew member. Survivors were rescued by Yorkshireman (United Kingdom).
Norval	United Kingdom	The ship was driven ashore and severely damaged in Table Bay. She was on a voyage from London to the Cape Colony and Bengal, India. Norval was refloated the next day.
Sylvanus	United Kingdom	The ship was driven ashore at "Hogeness", Sweden. She was refloated in mid-July.
Verheldersum	Netherlands	The ship struck a rock and foundered off Warren Point, County Down, United Kingdom. She was on a voyage from Rotterdam, South Holland to Belfast, County Antrim, United Kingdom.

== 8 April ==
List of shipwrecks: 8 April 1826
Ship	State	Description
Desiré	France	The ship was driven ashore and capsized at Oye-Plage, Pas-de-Calais. She was on a voyage from Cette, Hérault to Dunkirk, Nord.

== 9 April ==
List of shipwrecks: 9 April 1826
Ship	State	Description
Twey Gebroeders	Netherlands	The ship was wrecked on the Norwegian coast with the loss of all hands. She was on a voyage from Norway to Harlingen, Friesland.

== 10 April ==
List of shipwrecks: 10 April 1826
Ship	State	Description
Alexander	United Kingdom	The ship was wrecked in Carnarvon Bay. All on board were rescued. She was on a voyage from Jamaica to Liverpool, Lancashire.
Helen	United Kingdom	The ship ran aground off Southport, Lancashire and was consequently beached at Lytham St. Annes, Lancashire. She was on a voyage from Sligo to Liverpool.
Mary	United Kingdom	The ship was wrecked on the Ambergrease Key. She was on a voyage from "Omna" to Gibraltar.
Union	(United Kingdom of Great Britain and Ireland) Jersey	The brig was wrecked on the Mixon Shoal, in the Bristol Channel off Swansea, Glamorgan. Her crew survived. She was on a voyage from Swansea to Jersey.

== 11 April ==
List of shipwrecks: 11 April 1826
Ship	State	Description
Charles Grant	British East India Company	The East Indiaman was driven ashore at Anjar, India. She was on a voyage from China to London. She was refloated and taken in to Bombay for repairs.
Giraffa	United Kingdom	The ship was driven ashore and wrecked near Bude, Cornwall with the loss of a crew member. She was on a voyage from Cork to London
Squirrel	(United Kingdom of Great Britain and Ireland) British North America	The ship sprang a leak and was beached on Prince Edward Island. She was on a voyage from Tobago to Saint John, New Brunswick.

== 12 April ==
List of shipwrecks: 12 April 1826
Ship	State	Description
Belisarius	(United Kingdom of Great Britain and Ireland) British North America	The schooner foundered in the Atlantic Ocean.
Courier	Netherlands	The ship was driven ashore on the south coast of Texel, North Holland.
Deux Amis	France	The ship ran aground at Saint-Valery-sur-Somme. She was on a voyage from Cette, Hérault to Málaga, Spain and Saint-Valery-sur-Somme.
Jeune Aline	France	The ship was driven ashore and wrecked at Camaret-sur-Mer, Finistère. She was on a voyage from Guadeloupe to Havre de Grâce, Seine-Inférieure.
Océan	France	The ship was driven ashore near St. Ives, Cornwall. She was on a voyage from Campeche, Mexico to Havre de Grâce, Seine-Inférieure.
Speedwell	(United Kingdom of Great Britain and Ireland) British North America	The schooner was abandoned in the Atlantic Ocean.

== 13 April ==
List of shipwrecks: 13 April 1826
Ship	State	Description
Australia	(United Kingdom of Great Britain and Ireland) New South Wales	The brig was driven ashore and wrecked 12 nautical miles (22 km) north of Newcastle. She was on a voyage from Batavia, Netherlands East Indies to Sydney
Mountaineer	United Kingdom	The ship was driven ashore at Aberdeen. She was on a voyage from Sunderland, County Durham to Aberdeen. Mountaineer was refloated the next day and taken to Aberdeen.
Waterville	United States	The ship was wrecked at São Miguel Island, Azores.

== 15 April ==
List of shipwrecks: 15 April 1826
Ship	State	Description
Duncan Forbes	United Kingdom	The ship was wrecked at Mazagan, Morocco. She was on a voyage from Bahia, Brazil to Gibraltar.
Hoop	Netherlands	The ship was driven ashore at Escalles, Pas-de-Calais, France. She was on a voyage from Amsterdam, North Holland to Lisbon, Portugal.
Howard	United Kingdom	The ship was wrecked near the mouth of the Hunter's River, New South Wales. She was on a voyage from Singapore to Sydney, New South Wales.
Livonia	United Kingdom	The ship was wrecked at Torekov, Sweden. Her crew were rescued. She was on a voyage from Liverpool, Lancashire to Libava, Courland Governorate.
Whitby	United Kingdom	The ship caught fire in the River Thames and was severely damaged.

== 16 April ==
List of shipwrecks: 16 April 1826
Ship	State	Description
Messenger	United Kingdom	The ship was wrecked at Rattray Head, Aberdeenshire. She was on a voyage from Cromarty to Inverkeithing, Fife.

== 17 April ==
List of shipwrecks: 17 April 1826
Ship	State	Description
Carolina	Bremen	The ship ran aground on the Tegeler Plate, in the North Sea. She was on a voyage from Bayonne, Basses-Pyrénées, France to Bremen. Carolina was later refloated and taken in to Fedderwarden, Duchy of Oldenburg.
Joker	United Kingdom	The schooner was wrecked on a reef off Seaton, Cornwall.

== 18 April ==
List of shipwrecks: 18 April 1826
Ship	State	Description
Jean	United Kingdom	The whaler was sunk by ice off the west coast of Greenland (70°20′N 10°00′W). Forty-seven of her 51 crew survived.

== 19 April ==
List of shipwrecks: 19 April 1826
Ship	State	Description
Harpooner	Bremen	The whaler was lost off Greenland with the loss of all hands.
Jane	United Kingdom	The ship ran aground in Calf Sound and was severely damaged. She was on a voyage from Strangford, County Antrim to Liverpool, Lancashire.
Lively	United Kingdom	The whaler was lost off Greenland with the loss of all hands.
Shipley	United Kingdom	The transport ship was wrecked at Kitridge Head, Barbados. All 147 people on board were rescued.

== 22 April ==
List of shipwrecks: 22 April 1826
Ship	State	Description
Ernestine	Stettin	The ship was driven ashore at Thisted, Denmark. Her crew were rescued. She was on a voyage from Stettin to Bordeaux, Gironde, France.
Venus	United Kingdom	The ship was driven ashore in the Bay of Adra, Spain.

== 23 April ==
List of shipwrecks: 23 April 1826
Ship	State	Description
Pereverance	United Kingdom	The ship was run into at Montevideo, Uruguay by a warship and was damaged beyond repair.
Tipton Hall	United Kingdom	The ship was driven ashore near Peniscola, Spain.
Union	United Kingdom	The ship's crew were murdered and the vessel run ashore and burnt at St. Andrew's, Africa.

== 24 April ==
List of shipwrecks: 24 April 1826
Ship	State	Description
Alfred	United Kingdom	The ship departed from Newfoundland, British North America for Pernambuco, Brazil. No further trace, presumed foundered with the loss of all hands.

== 26 April ==
List of shipwrecks: 26 April 1826
Ship	State	Description
Antrim	United Kingdom	The ship was holed by an anchor and sank near Garmoyle, County Antrim. She was on a voyage from Glasgow, Renfrewshire to Belfast, County Antrim.
Veloce	Grand Duchy of Tuscany	The ship sprang a leak and foundered in the Mediterranean Sea. Her crew survived. She was on a voyage from Livorno to Malta.

== 27 April ==
List of shipwrecks: 27 April 1826
Ship	State	Description
Helena	Netherlands	The ship was abandoned in the Atlantic Ocean.
Traveller	United Kingdom	The ship was wrecked on Cape Sable Island, Nova Scotia, British North America. Her crew were rescued. She was on a voyage from Liverpool, Lancashire to Halifax, Nova Scotia.

== 28 April ==
List of shipwrecks: 28 April 1826
Ship	State	Description
Gesina Gerdina	Norway	The ship was driven ashore near Dunkirk, Nord, France. She was on a voyage from Mandahl to Rouen, Seine-Inférieure.

== 30 April ==
List of shipwrecks: 30 April 1826
Ship	State	Description
James Hunter	United States	The ship was wrecked in the Magdalen Islands, Nova Scotia, British North America with the loss of a crew member. She was on a voyage from Halifax, Nova Scotia to Quebec City, Lower Canada, British North America.
Model	France	The ship was wrecked on the Morasoca Rock, off Marajó, Brazil. She was on a voyage from Pará, Brazil to Martinique.
Skipsey	United Kingdom	The ship was abandoned in the Atlantic Ocean. Her crew were rescued by Isaac Hicks (United States). Skipsey was on a voyage from London to Miramichi, New Brunswick, British North America.
Symmetry	United Kingdom	The ship was driven ashore and wrecked near Skagen, Denmark. Her crew were rescued. She was on a voyage from Memel, Prussia to Youghal, County Cork.

== Unknown date ==
List of shipwrecks: Unknown date in April 1826
Ship	State	Description
Amoricain	France	The ship was wrecked on the coast of Senegal.
Emma	United Kingdom	The ship ran aground and was beached at Porto, Portugal. She was on a voyage from Newport, Monmouthshire to Porto.
Errinerung	Stettin	The ship was lost on Ertholmene, Denmark. She was on a voyage from Stettin to London, United Kingdom.
Freundschaft	Flag unknown	The ship was wrecked near Gibraltar. Her crew were rescued. She was on a voyage from Matanzas, Cuba to Gibraltar.
George & Wilhelm	United Kingdom	The ship foundered off the coast of Cornwall between 10 and 17 April. She was on a voyage from Cork to Riga, Russia.
Inca	United Kingdom	The ship ran aground on the Camotal Bank. She was on a voyage from Guatemala City to Lima, Peru. Inca was refloated three days later with assistance from Diligente (French Navy) and USS United States (United States Navy).
Mars	(United Kingdom of Great Britain and Ireland) New South Wales	The cutter was wrecked near Port Stephens.
Narrow Escape	United Kingdom	The ship was wrecked in a cove near Tintagel, Cornwall when a heavy ground sea suddenly rose. Her crew survived.
Scipio	Flag unknown	The schooner was lost at Tangier, Morocco.
Stanmore	United Kingdom	The ship was destroyed by fire at Bengal, India before 5 April.
Sylvanus	United Kingdom	The ship was driven ashore at Hogeness, Sweden.
Tamibestotten	Norway	The ship sprang a leak and was abandoned by her crew. She was on a voyage from Dordrecht, South Holland, Netherlands to Bergen.
