= Tocqueville, Manche =

Tocqueville
- Commune
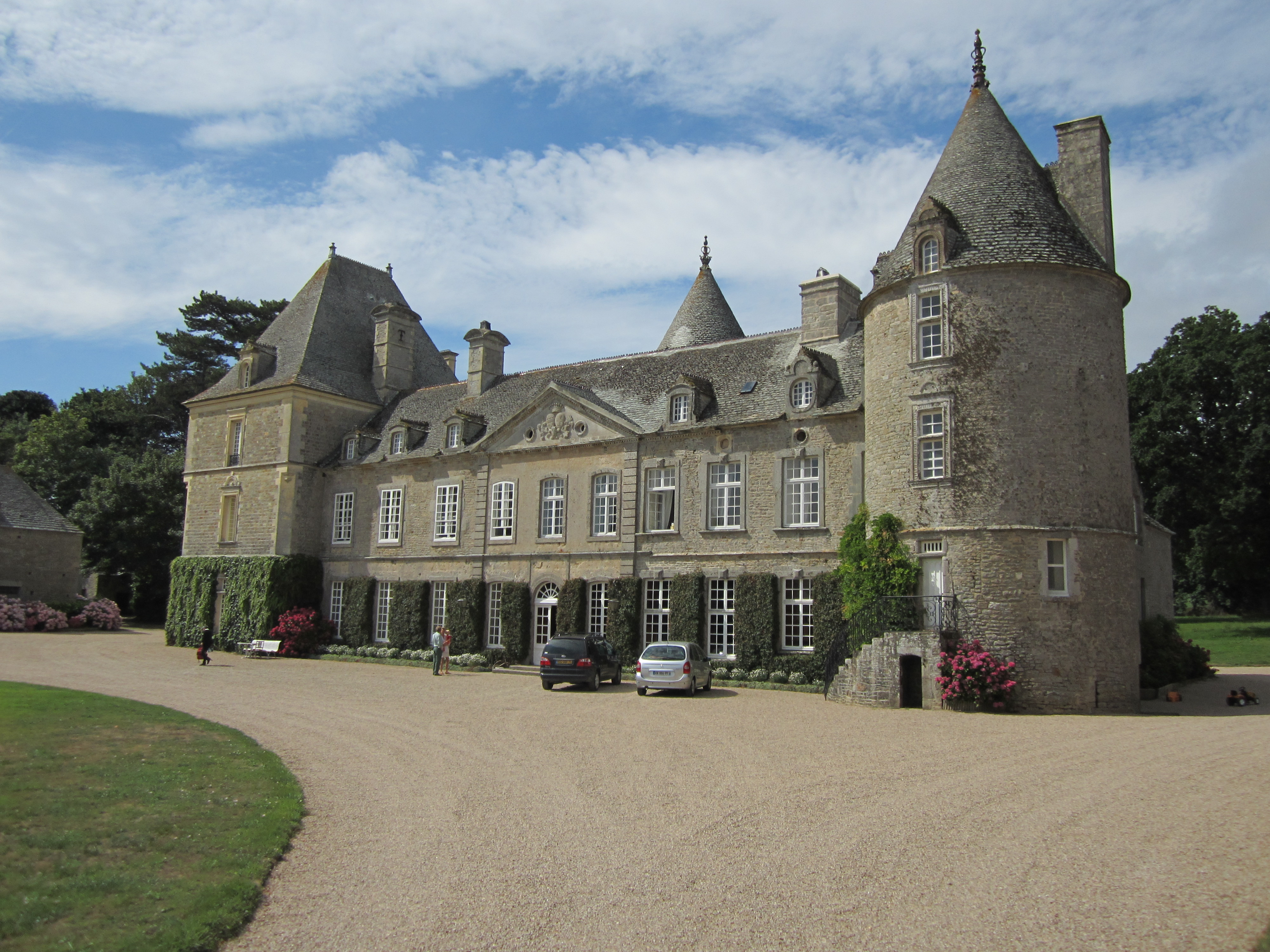
- The chateau in Tocqueville

- Coat of arms
- Location of Tocqueville
- Location within France Location within Normandy
- Coordinates: 49°40′17″N 1°20′08″W
- Country: France
- Region: Normandy
- Department: Manche
- Arrondissement: Cherbourg
- Canton: Val-de-Saire
- Intercommunality: CA Cotentin

Government
  - Mayor (2020–2026): Chantal Ducouret
- Area^{1}: 5.90 km^{2} (2.28 sq mi)
- Elevation: 36 m (118 ft)
- Highest elevation: 71 m (233 ft)
- Lowest elevation: 8 m (26 ft)
- Population (2023): 258
  - Density: 43.7/km^{2} (113/sq mi)
- Time zone: UTC+01:00 (CET)
  - Summer (DST): UTC+02:00 (CEST)
- INSEE/Postal code: 50598 /50330
- ^{1} French Land Register data, which excludes lakes, ponds, glaciers > 1 km^{2} (0.386 sq mi or 247 acres) and river estuaries.

Tocqueville (French pronunciation: [tɔkvil]) is a commune in the Manche department in Normandy in north-western France.

== See also ==
- Communes of the Manche department
- Alexis de Tocqueville
- Tocqueville (disambiguation)
