= Penly Nuclear Power Plant =

Nuclear power plant in France

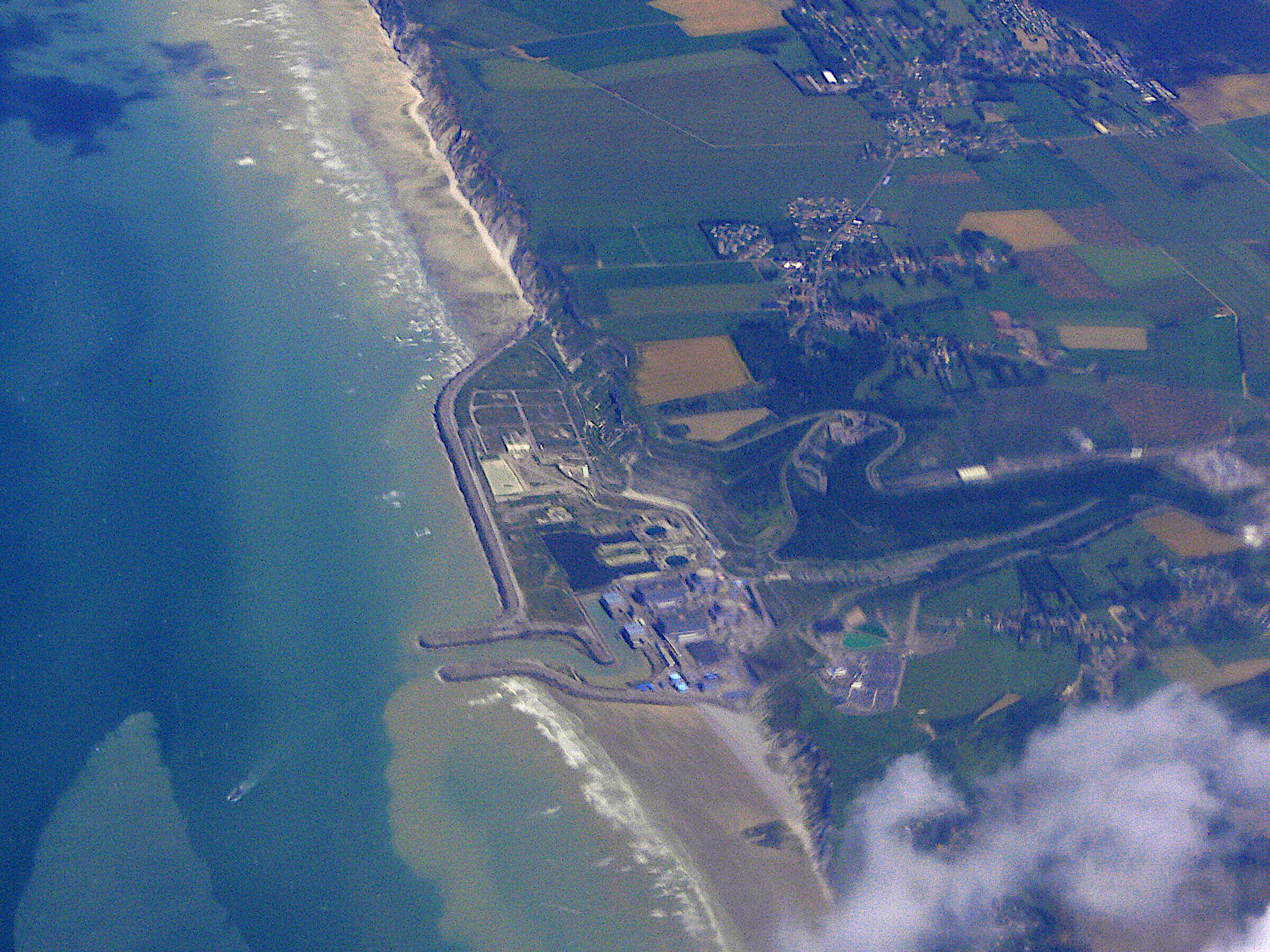
- Official name: Centrale Nucléaire de Penly
- Country: France
- Location: Dieppe, Seine-Maritime
- Coordinates: 49°58′36″N 01°12′43″E
- Status: Operational
- Construction began: 1982
- Commission date: 4 May 1990; 35 years ago
- Operator: EDF

Nuclear power station
- Reactor type: PWR
- Reactor supplier: Framatome
- Cooling source: English Channel

Power generation
- Units operational: 2 × 1382 MW
- Make and model: Alstom
- Units cancelled: 1 × 1650 MW
- Nameplate capacity: 2764 MW
- Capacity factor: 80.2%
- Annual net output: 19,418 GW·h

External links
- Website: Site c/o Betreibers
- Commons: Related media on Commons

The Penly Nuclear power station (French: Centrale nucléaire de Penly) is found some 6 miles (10 km) northeast of Dieppe. It lies on the border of two French municipalities: Penly and Saint-Martin-en-Campagne in the département of Seine-Maritime, Normandy, on the English Channel coast. It employs France's only working funicular railway in industrial use.

== Data ==
The plant employs about 670 people full-time and is owned and operated by the French company Électricité de France. Water from the English Channel is used for cooling.

The two PWR units are of the 1330 MWe class. The installed total output is 2764 MW, which means the plant is about average for French nuclear plants. It feeds on average about 18 billion kilowatt-hours per year into the public grid, corresponding to about 80% of the annual consumption of Normandy. It is about 10 kilometres (6.2 mi) from Dieppe.

== Proposed third and fourth reactors ==
In January 2009, the French government announced that a third reactor, the second French EPR reactor, would be built in Penly. Construction was announced for 2012 with connection to the grid following in 2017. GDF Suez was to own a part of the plant, with the majority taken by EDF. However, in 2010 GDF Suez withdrew from the project. In 2011, following the Fukushima Daiichi nuclear disaster, EDF postponed public consultations putting in doubt the 2012 construction start date. In February 2013, the Minister of Industrial Renewal Arnaud Montebourg stated that the plans for a new EPR reactor at Penly had been canceled, citing the capacity for electricity production and massive investments in renewable energy along with his confidence in the EPR as a competitive project in foreign countries.

In 2019, EDF is seeking a site for the construction of a pair of EPR reactors, and Penly is considered as one of the lead contenders.

In June 2023, EDF announced it was starting the authorisation process to build two EPR 2 reactors, anticipating that site preparatory work would begin in summer 2024 and construction would begin about 2027.

== Accidents and incidents ==
9 June 2004 - Weakly radioactive water was leaked into the sea from the reserve tank of a reactor's secondary circuit.

11 October 2011 - A subcontractor employee had localised contamination on his face.

5 April 2012 - 10 Fire engines attended a small fire within a reactor building. The operating company later reported two small oil fires inside the reactor building from a leaking oil pipe were extinguished with nobody hurt and no environmental impact. The detection of smoke caused the reactor to be automatically shut down.

6 April 2012 - As a consequence of the incident of 5 April 2012 a joint had leaked radioactive water into collection tanks inside the reactor building. The incident was classified as 1 (lowest) on the 7 point International Nuclear Event Scale.

8 March 2023 - Due to potentially serious cracks in the pipework of the hot leg of the safety injection system, layered safety may have been compromised (INES 2). The crack was in an area not considered as susceptible to stress corrosion cracking, so EDF will have to revise its strategy for repairing stress corrosion issues. The area had undergone a double repair during construction.
