= Petit-Caux =

- Commune
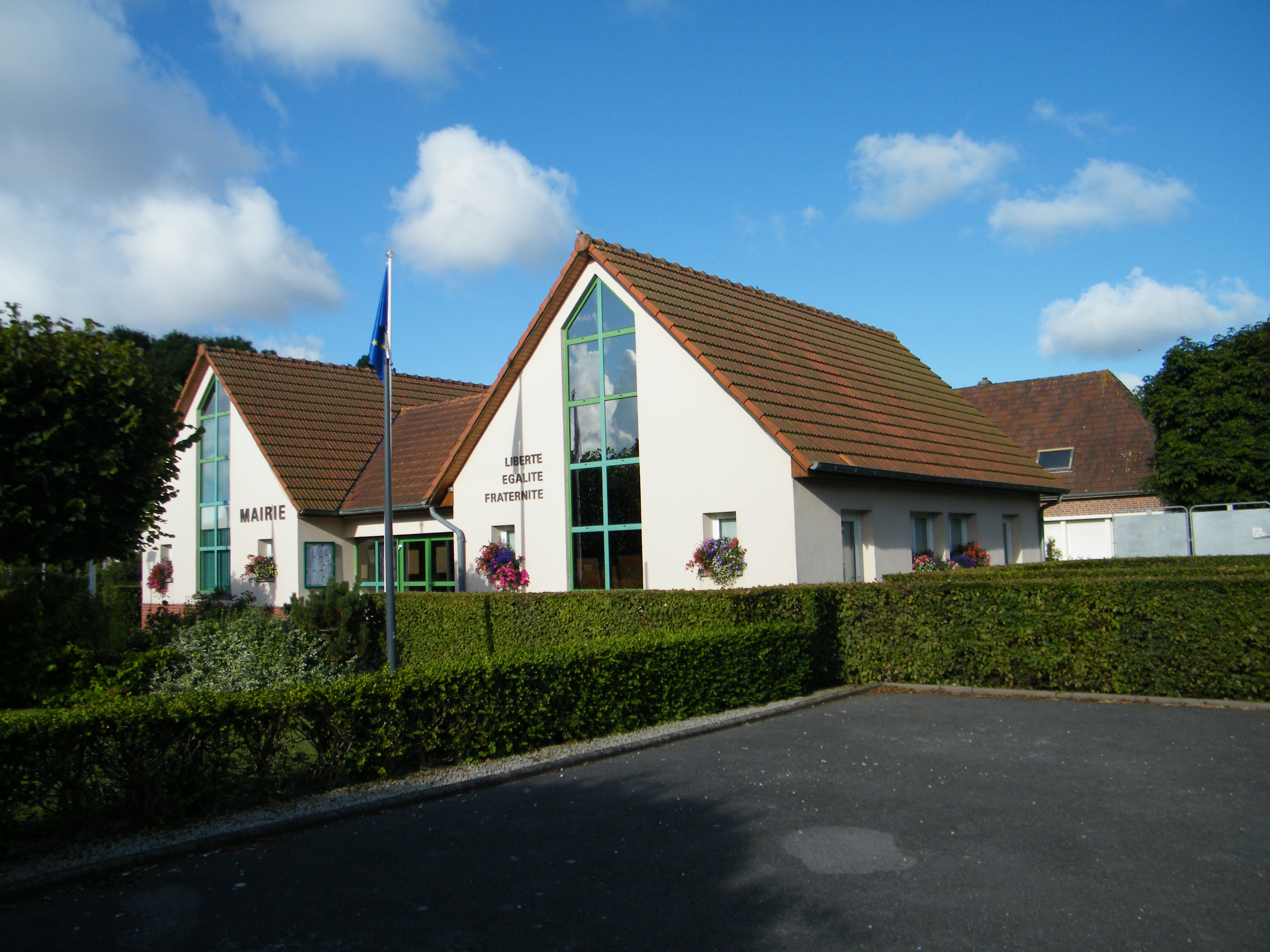
- The town hall in Berneval-le-Grand
- Location of Petit-Caux
- Location within France Location within Normandy
- Coordinates: 49°57′25″N 1°13′23″E
- Country: France
- Region: Normandy
- Department: Seine-Maritime
- Arrondissement: Dieppe
- Canton: Dieppe-2
- Intercommunality: CC Falaises du Talou

Government
  - Mayor (2020–2026): Patrice Philippe
- Area^{1}: 91.11 km^{2} (35.18 sq mi)
- Population (2023): 9,513
  - Density: 104.4/km^{2} (270.4/sq mi)
- Time zone: UTC+01:00 (CET)
  - Summer (DST): UTC+02:00 (CEST)
- INSEE/Postal code: 76618 /76370, 76630, 76910
- ^{1} French Land Register data, which excludes lakes, ponds, glaciers > 1 km^{2} (0.386 sq mi or 247 acres) and river estuaries.

Petit-Caux (French pronunciation: [pəti ko], lit. 'Little Caux') is a commune in the department of Seine-Maritime, northern France. The municipality was established on 1 January 2016 by merger of the 18 former communes of Saint-Martin-en-Campagne, Assigny, Auquemesnil, Belleville-sur-Mer, Berneval-le-Grand, Biville-sur-Mer, Bracquemont, Brunville, Derchigny, Glicourt, Gouchaupre, Greny, Guilmécourt, Intraville, Penly, Saint-Quentin-au-Bosc, Tocqueville-sur-Eu and Tourville-la-Chapelle. These communes previously cooperated in the Communauté de communes du Petit Caux.

== Population ==
Population data refer to the area corresponding with the commune as of January 2025.

Historical population
Year	Pop.	±% p.a.
1968	4,750	—
1975	4,981	+0.68%
1982	5,932	+2.53%
1990	6,894	+1.90%
1999	7,178	+0.45%
2007	8,291	+1.82%
2012	9,042	+1.75%
2017	9,553	+1.11%
2023	9,513	−0.07%
Source: INSEE

== Sights ==
- Museum of the History of Everyday Life in Saint-Martin-en-Campagne.

== See also ==
- Communes of the Seine-Maritime department
