= Saint-Martin-en-Campagne =

- Part of Petit-Caux
- Location of Saint-Martin-en-Campagne
- Location within France Location within Normandy
- Coordinates: 49°57′28″N 1°13′21″E
- Country: France
- Region: Normandy
- Department: Seine-Maritime
- Arrondissement: Dieppe
- Canton: Dieppe-2
- Commune: Petit-Caux
- Area^{1}: 6.85 km^{2} (2.64 sq mi)
- Elevation: 118 m (387 ft)
- Highest elevation: 128 m (420 ft)
- Lowest elevation: 0 m (0 ft)
- Population (2022): 1,240
  - Density: 181/km^{2} (469/sq mi)
- Time zone: UTC+01:00 (CET)
  - Summer (DST): UTC+02:00 (CEST)
- Postal code: 76370
- ^{1} French Land Register data, which excludes lakes, ponds, glaciers > 1 km^{2} (0.386 sq mi or 247 acres) and river estuaries.

Saint-Martin-en-Campagne is a former commune in the Seine-Maritime department in the Normandy region in northern France. On 1 January 2016, it was merged into the new commune of Petit-Caux.

== Geography ==
A coastal farming village situated in the Pays de Caux, at the junction of the D113, D313 and the D925 roads, some 5 miles (8.0 km) east of Dieppe. Huge chalk cliffs rise up over a pebble beach and overlook the English Channel. The Penly Nuclear Power Plant is also sited in this commune.

== Heraldry ==
Arms of Saint-Martin-en-Campagne	The arms of Saint-Martin-en-Campagne are blazoned : Gules, a sword, on a chapé argent a lion and an alerion gules, and on a chief azure, a seagull proper.

== Population ==
Historical population
Year	Pop.	±% p.a.
1962	484	—
1968	544	+1.97%
1975	562	+0.47%
1982	833	+5.78%
1990	1,104	+3.58%
1999	1,000	−1.09%
2013	1,256	+1.64%
2022	1,240	−0.14%
Source: EHESS and INSEE

== Places of interest ==
- The church of Notre-Dame, dating from the fifteenth century.
- A stone cross from the sixteenth century.
- The Penly Nuclear Power Plant on the coast, with two reactors of 1300 MW each.

== See also ==
- Communes of the Seine-Maritime department
