= Greny =

- Part of Petit-Caux
- Location of Greny
- Location within France Location within Normandy
- Coordinates: 49°56′51″N 1°18′25″E
- Country: France
- Region: Normandy
- Department: Seine-Maritime
- Arrondissement: Dieppe
- Canton: Dieppe-2
- Commune: Petit-Caux
- Area^{1}: 4.06 km^{2} (1.57 sq mi)
- Elevation: 125 m (410 ft)
- Highest elevation: 149 m (489 ft)
- Lowest elevation: 87 m (285 ft)
- Population (2023): 97
  - Density: 24/km^{2} (62/sq mi)
- Time zone: UTC+01:00 (CET)
  - Summer (DST): UTC+02:00 (CEST)
- Postal code: 76630
- ^{1} French Land Register data, which excludes lakes, ponds, glaciers > 1 km^{2} (0.386 sq mi or 247 acres) and river estuaries.

Greny is a former commune in the Seine-Maritime department in the Normandy region in northern France. On 1 January 2016, it was merged into the new commune of Petit-Caux.

== Geography ==
A small farming village, Greny is situated in the Pays de Caux, some 9 miles (14 km) east of Dieppe on the D117 road.

== Heraldry ==
| Arms of Greny | The arms of Greny are blazoned : Vert, a chevron argent between 2 garbs and a tree, and on a chief Or a leopard gules. |

== Places of interest ==
- The church of St. Anne, dating from the seventeenth century.

== See also ==
- Communes of the Seine-Maritime department
