= Berneval-le-Grand =

- Part of Petit-Caux
- Location of Berneval-le-Grand
- Location within France Location within Normandy
- Coordinates: 49°57′32″N 1°11′20″E
- Country: France
- Region: Normandy
- Department: Seine-Maritime
- Arrondissement: Dieppe
- Canton: Dieppe-2
- Commune: Petit-Caux
- Area^{1}: 5.56 km^{2} (2.15 sq mi)
- Elevation: 104 m (341 ft)
- Highest elevation: 110 m (360 ft)
- Lowest elevation: 0 m (0 ft)
- Population (2022): 1,424
  - Density: 256/km^{2} (663/sq mi)
- Time zone: UTC+01:00 (CET)
  - Summer (DST): UTC+02:00 (CEST)
- Postal code: 76370
- ^{1} French Land Register data, which excludes lakes, ponds, glaciers > 1 km^{2} (0.386 sq mi or 247 acres) and river estuaries.

Berneval-le-Grand is a former commune in the Seine-Maritime department in the Normandy region in northern France. On 1 January 2016, it was merged into the new commune of Petit-Caux.

== Geography ==
A farming village in the Pays de Caux, situated on the cliff-lined coast of the English Channel some 5 miles (8.0 km) northeast of Dieppe, at the junction of the D54 and D113 roads.

== History ==
On the morning of 19 August 1942, the beach at Berneval was one of the landing locations of the Anglo-Canadian raid on Dieppe. No. 3 Commando landed on "Yellow 1", the beach of Petit Berneval, but got stuck at the top of the cliffs, unable to fulfil their mission. Most were killed or captured, only one managed to escape by swimming back to the boats. Those who landed on "Yellow 2", at the Fond de Belleville, crossed the fields and attacked the gun emplacements, preventing the German gunners aiming at the beaches of Dieppe where the bulk of the landings took place. They all were able to escape by the same route and return to Newhaven.

=== Heraldry ===
Arms of Berneval-le-Grand	The arms of Berneval-le-Grand are blazoned : Azure, a pale lozengy argent and gules, between, in bend 2 garbs of wheat Or, and in bend sinister 2 ships argent.

== Population ==
Historical population
Year	Pop.	±% p.a.
1962	641	—
1968	666	+0.64%
1975	760	+1.90%
1982	893	+2.33%
1990	998	+1.40%
1999	1,047	+0.53%
2006	1,166	+1.55%
2022	1,424	+1.26%
Source: EHESS and INSEE

== Places of interest ==
- The church of Notre-Dame, rebuilt, as was most of the village, after the Second World War. The original church, dating back to the 13th century, was destroyed on 3 June 1944 by Allied bombers.

== Notable people linked to the commune ==
- After his release from Reading Prison, Oscar Wilde stayed in Berneval in June 1897. He was accompanied by his friend and future literary executor, the Canadian journalist, art critic and art dealer Robert Ross. Most of his former friends abandoned him, but André Gide came to meet him at the Hôtel de la Plage (destroyed during the Second World War). He found Wilde a broken man, still a prisoner in his soul despite his freedom. In Berneval, Wilde wrote The Ballad of Reading Gaol.
- Edward Vincent Loustalot, regarded as the first American soldier killed by the Germans in the Second World War, died here on 19 August 1942.
- During the 1970s, a large part of Walerian Borowczyk's film, Les Contes immoraux (Eng: Immoral Tales), was made in Berneval in the Grand Hôtel, Avenue du Capitaine-Porthéous.
- Auguste Renoir, Pissarro and Hippolyte Camille Delpy, among others, painted landscapes in Berneval-le-Grand.
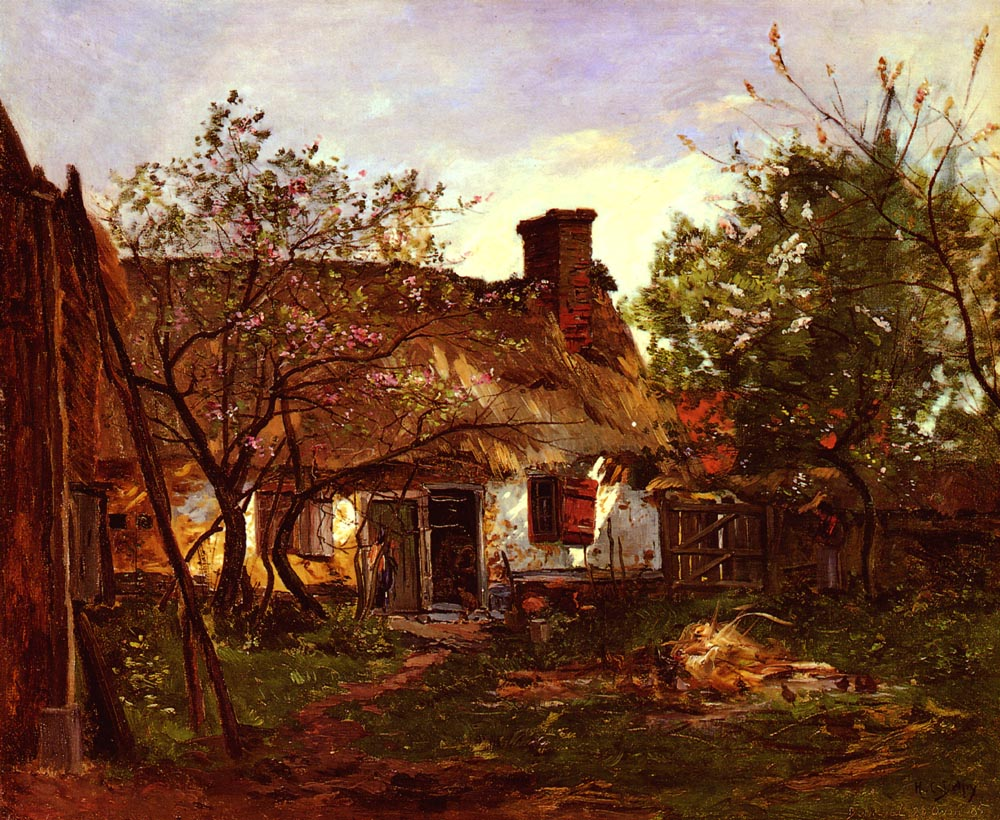
Delpy :
Chaumière à Berneval.

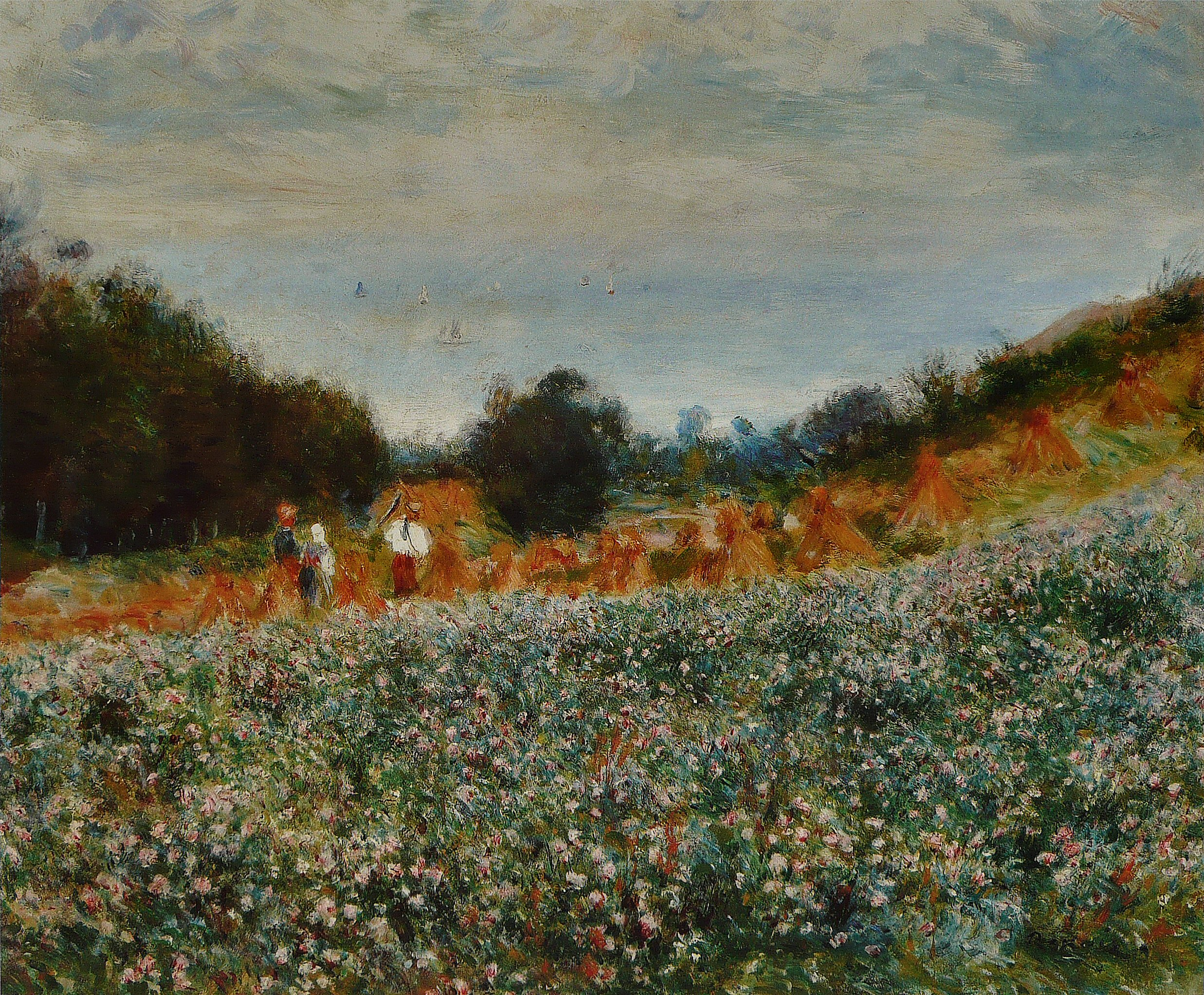
Renoir :
La Moisson à Berneval
1880.

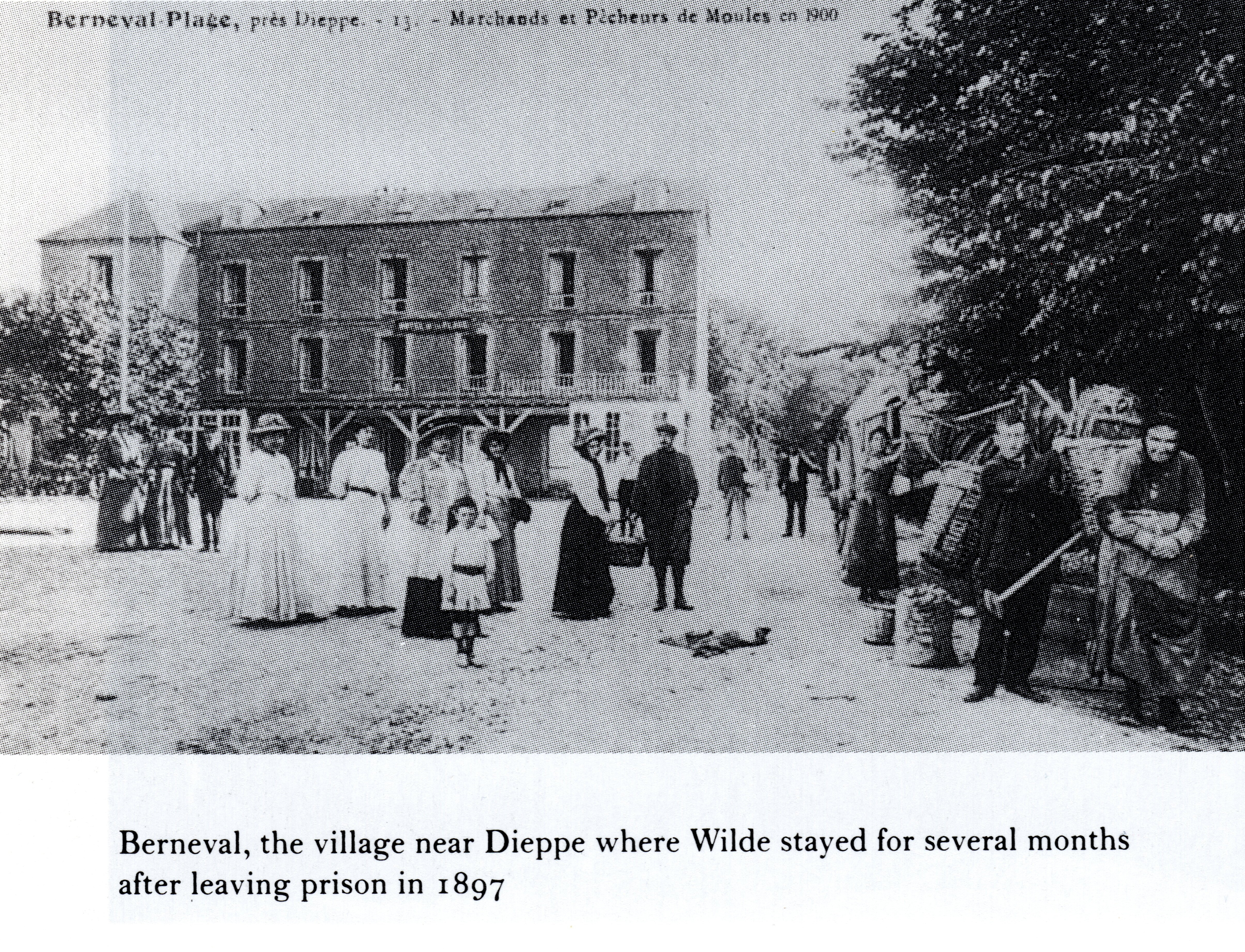
Berneval 1900

== See also ==
- Communes of the Seine-Maritime department
