= E. V. Loustalot =

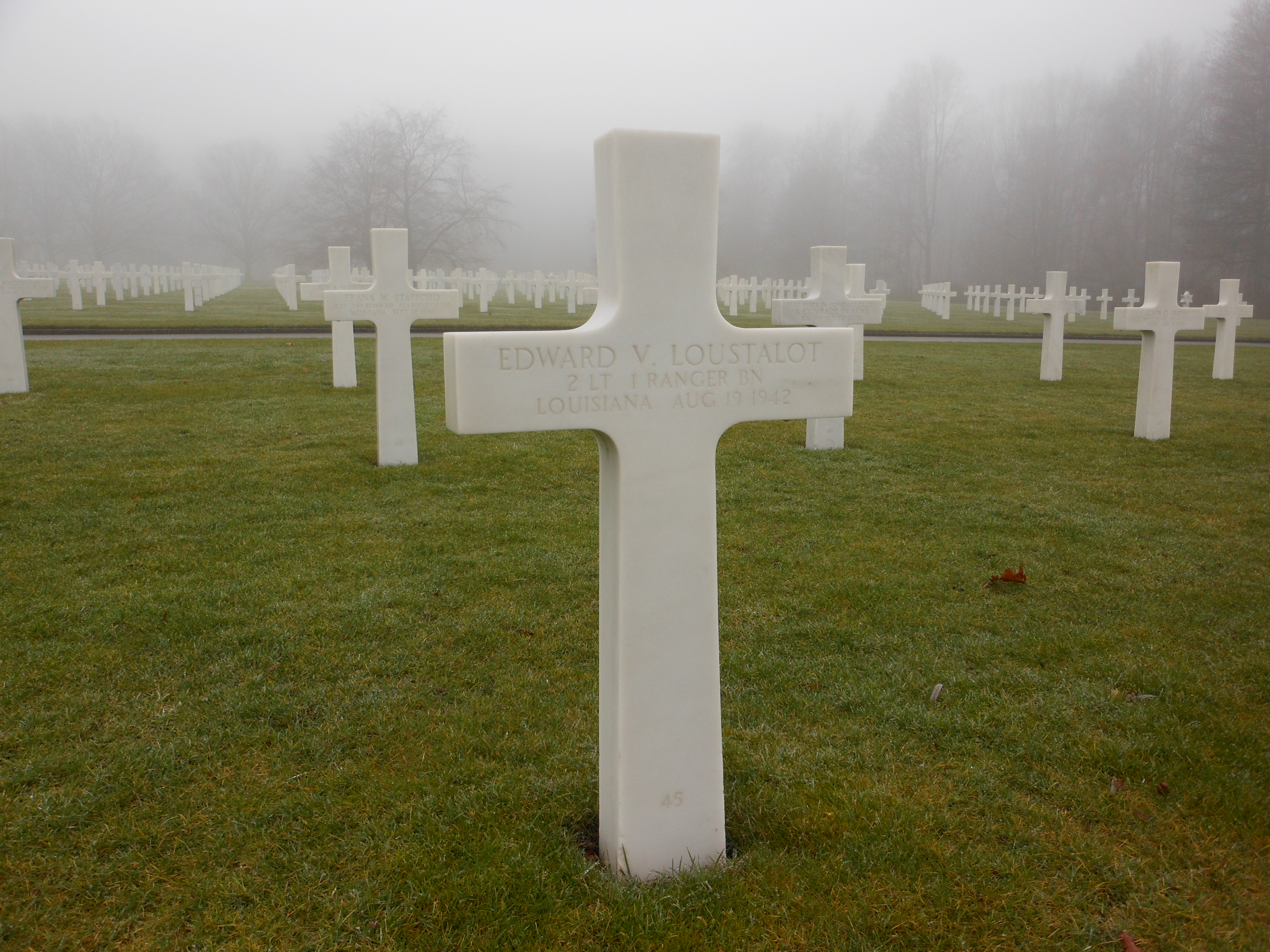

Edward Vincent Loustalot was a U.S. Army Rangers Second Lieutenant from Franklin, Louisiana. He was killed in action on August 19, 1942, while participating in the Dieppe Raid and is considered the first American soldier to be killed by Germans on land in World War II. Two other Americans, both of the 1st Ranger Battalion, died at Dieppe: Lieutenant Joseph Randall and T-4 Howard Henry.

During the mission, Loustalot took command after the British Captain leading the assault was killed. He scaled a steep cliff with his men, was wounded three times, but was eventually cut down by enemy crossfire in his attempts to reach the machine gun nest at the top of the cliff.

Lieutenant Loustalot is buried in the Ardennes American Cemetery in Belgium. The Germans originally interred him with the Canadians at Dieppe.

Frequently, accounts of the Dieppe Raid have incorrectly referred to him as Edwin rather than Edward.
