= Gouchaupre =

- Part of Petit-Caux
- Location of Gouchaupre
- Location within France Location within Normandy
- Coordinates: 49°55′52″N 1°17′59″E
- Country: France
- Region: Normandy
- Department: Seine-Maritime
- Arrondissement: Dieppe
- Canton: Dieppe-2
- Commune: Petit-Caux
- Area^{1}: 4.34 km^{2} (1.68 sq mi)
- Elevation: 149 m (489 ft)
- Highest elevation: 154 m (505 ft)
- Lowest elevation: 126 m (413 ft)
- Population (2023): 185
  - Density: 42.6/km^{2} (110/sq mi)
- Time zone: UTC+01:00 (CET)
  - Summer (DST): UTC+02:00 (CEST)
- Postal code: 76630
- ^{1} French Land Register data, which excludes lakes, ponds, glaciers > 1 km^{2} (0.386 sq mi or 247 acres) and river estuaries.

Gouchaupre is a former commune in the Seine-Maritime department in the Normandy region in north-western France. On 1 January 2016, it was merged into the new commune of Petit-Caux.

== Geography ==
A small farming village situated in the Pays de Caux, some 11 miles (18 km) east of Dieppe, at the junction of the D 26 and the D 22 roads.

== Places of interest ==
- The sixteenth century church of Saint-Jean-Baptiste.

== See also ==
- Communes of the Seine-Maritime department
