= Tourville-la-Chapelle =

- Part of Petit-Caux
- Location of Tourville-la-Chapelle
- Location within France Location within Normandy
- Coordinates: 49°56′39″N 1°15′45″E
- Country: France
- Region: Normandy
- Department: Seine-Maritime
- Arrondissement: Dieppe
- Canton: Dieppe-2
- Commune: Petit-Caux
- Area^{1}: 7.71 km^{2} (2.98 sq mi)
- Elevation: 140 m (460 ft)
- Highest elevation: 147 m (482 ft)
- Lowest elevation: 94 m (308 ft)
- Population (2023): 560
  - Density: 73/km^{2} (190/sq mi)
- Time zone: UTC+01:00 (CET)
  - Summer (DST): UTC+02:00 (CEST)
- Postal code: 76630
- ^{1} French Land Register data, which excludes lakes, ponds, glaciers > 1 km^{2} (0.386 sq mi or 247 acres) and river estuaries.

Tourville-la-Chapelle is a former commune in the Seine-Maritime department in the Normandy region in northern France. On 1 January 2016, it was merged into the new commune of Petit-Caux.

== Geography ==
A farming village situated in the Pays de Caux, some 8 miles (13 km) east of Dieppe at the junction of the D454 and the D26 roads.

== Places of interest ==
- The church of Notre-Dame, dating from the twelfth century.
- A seventeenth-century stone cross.

== See also ==
- Communes of the Seine-Maritime department
