= Brunville =

- Part of Petit-Caux
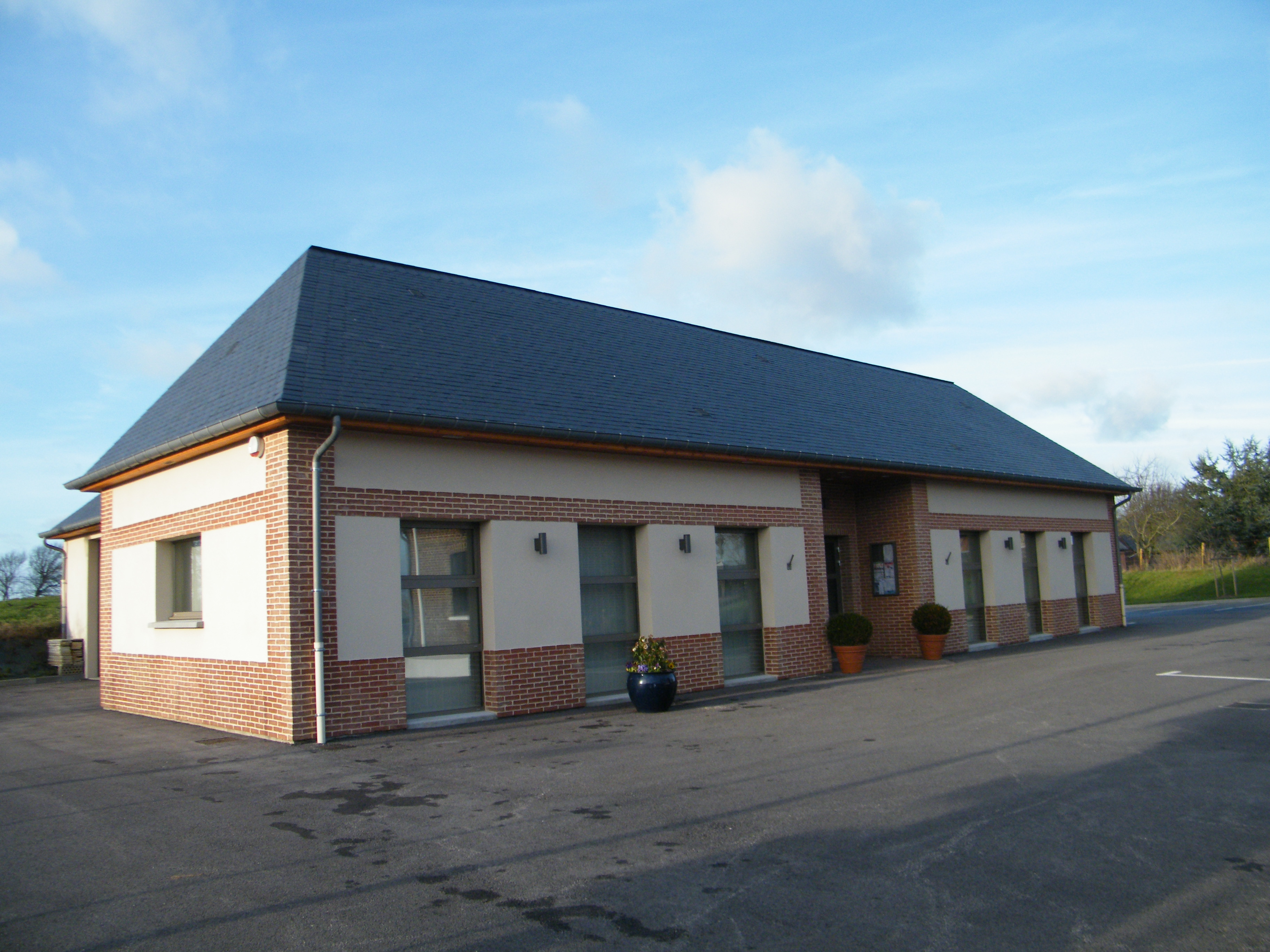
- Brunville Town hall

- Coat of arms
- Location of Brunville
- Location within France Location within Normandy
- Coordinates: 49°58′02″N 1°16′08″E
- Country: France
- Region: Normandy
- Department: Seine-Maritime
- Arrondissement: Dieppe
- Canton: Dieppe-2
- Commune: Petit-Caux
- Area^{1}: 3.92 km^{2} (1.51 sq mi)
- Elevation: 104 m (341 ft)
- Highest elevation: 137 m (449 ft)
- Lowest elevation: 100 m (330 ft)
- Population (2023): 236
  - Density: 60.2/km^{2} (156/sq mi)
- Time zone: UTC+01:00 (CET)
  - Summer (DST): UTC+02:00 (CEST)
- Postal code: 76630
- ^{1} French Land Register data, which excludes lakes, ponds, glaciers > 1 km^{2} (0.386 sq mi or 247 acres) and river estuaries.

Brunville is a former commune in the Seine-Maritime department in the Normandy region in north-western France. On 1 January 2016, it was merged into the new commune of Petit-Caux.

== Geography ==
A small farming village situated in the Pays de Caux, 10 miles (16 km) northeast of Dieppe, on the D 113 road.

== Heraldry ==
Arms of Brunville	The arms of Brunville are blazoned : Gules, a garb of wheat Or, on a chief wavy azure, a boat ?? argent between 2 pine cones Or.

== Places of interest ==
- The church of St. Adrien, dating from the nineteenth century.
- The remains of a château.

== See also ==
- Communes of the Seine-Maritime department
