= Intraville =

- Part of Petit-Caux
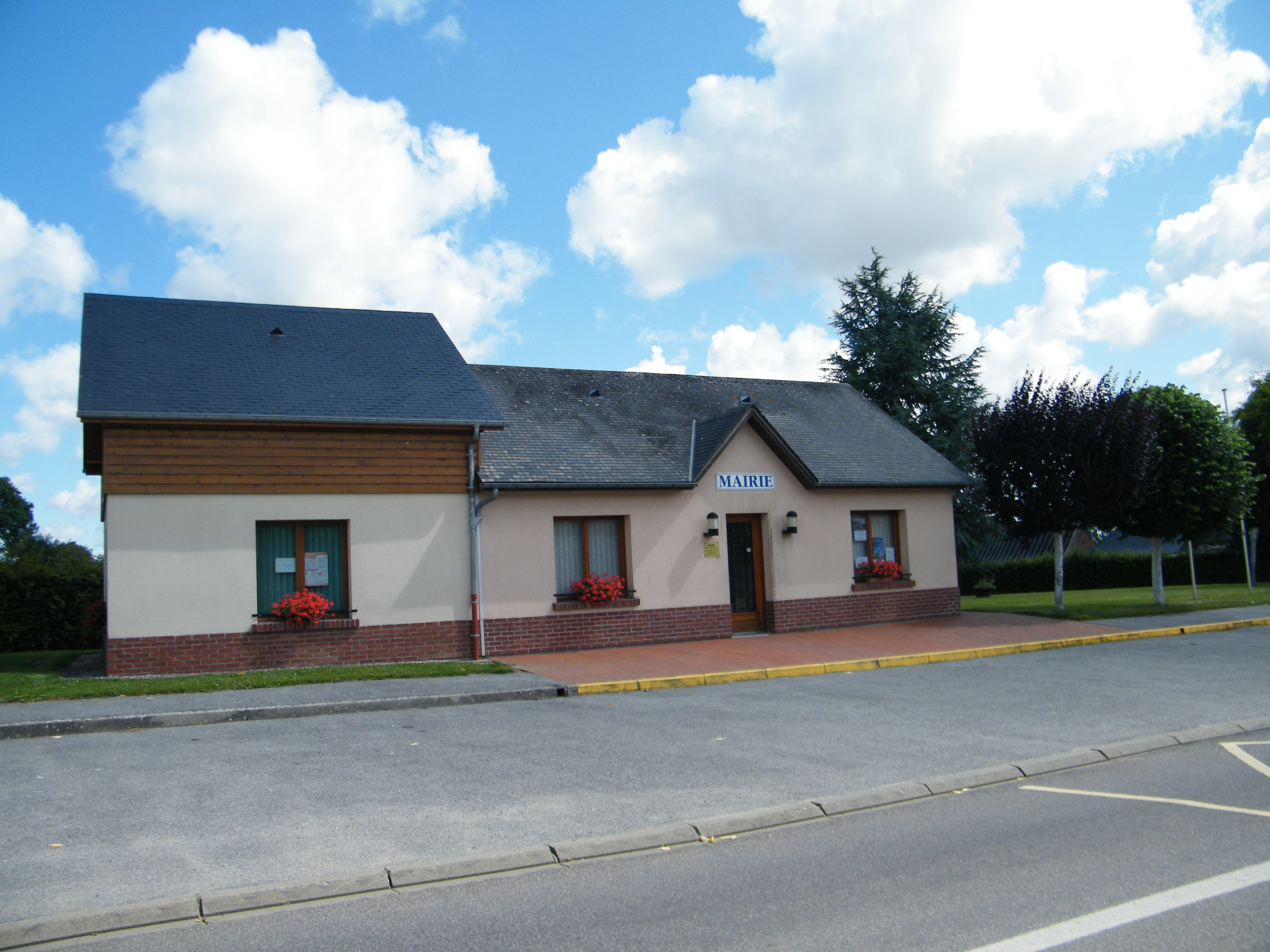
- Town hall
- Location of Intraville
- Location within France Location within Normandy
- Coordinates: 49°55′59″N 1°16′48″E
- Country: France
- Region: Normandy
- Department: Seine-Maritime
- Arrondissement: Dieppe
- Canton: Dieppe-2
- Commune: Petit-Caux
- Area^{1}: 4.66 km^{2} (1.80 sq mi)
- Elevation: 130 m (430 ft)
- Highest elevation: 149 m (489 ft)
- Lowest elevation: 91 m (299 ft)
- Population (2023): 318
  - Density: 68.2/km^{2} (177/sq mi)
- Time zone: UTC+01:00 (CET)
  - Summer (DST): UTC+02:00 (CEST)
- Postal code: 76630
- ^{1} French Land Register data, which excludes lakes, ponds, glaciers > 1 km^{2} (0.386 sq mi or 247 acres) and river estuaries.

Intraville is a former commune in the Seine-Maritime department in the Normandy region in northern France. On 1 January 2016, it was merged into the new commune of Petit-Caux.

== Geography ==
A farming village situated in the Pays de Caux, some 9 miles (14 km) east of Dieppe at the junction of the D222 and the D256 roads.

== Heraldry ==
Arms of Intraville	The arms of Intraville are blazoned : Or, on a fess gules between 3 arrows point down azure, a sword point to sinister argent.

== Places of interest ==
- The church of St.Séverin & St.Pierre, dating from the sixteenth century.

== See also ==
- Communes of the Seine-Maritime department
