= Glicourt =

- Part of Petit-Caux
- Location of Glicourt
- Location within France Location within Normandy
- Coordinates: 49°56′09″N 1°14′30″E
- Country: France
- Region: Normandy
- Department: Seine-Maritime
- Arrondissement: Dieppe
- Canton: Dieppe-2
- Commune: Petit-Caux
- Area^{1}: 4.58 km^{2} (1.77 sq mi)
- Elevation: 100 m (330 ft)
- Highest elevation: 131 m (430 ft)
- Lowest elevation: 56 m (184 ft)
- Population (2023): 289
  - Density: 63.1/km^{2} (163/sq mi)
- Time zone: UTC+01:00 (CET)
  - Summer (DST): UTC+02:00 (CEST)
- Postal code: 76630
- ^{1} French Land Register data, which excludes lakes, ponds, glaciers > 1 km^{2} (0.386 sq mi or 247 acres) and river estuaries.

Glicourt is a former commune in the Seine-Maritime department in the Normandy region in northern France. On 1 January 2016, it was merged into the new commune of Petit-Caux.

== Geography ==
A small farming village situated in the Pays de Caux, some 10 miles (16 km) east of Dieppe, on the D454 road.

== Places of interest ==
- The twelfth century church of Saint-Martin.

== See also ==
- Communes of the Seine-Maritime department
