= Auquemesnil =

- Part of Petit-Caux
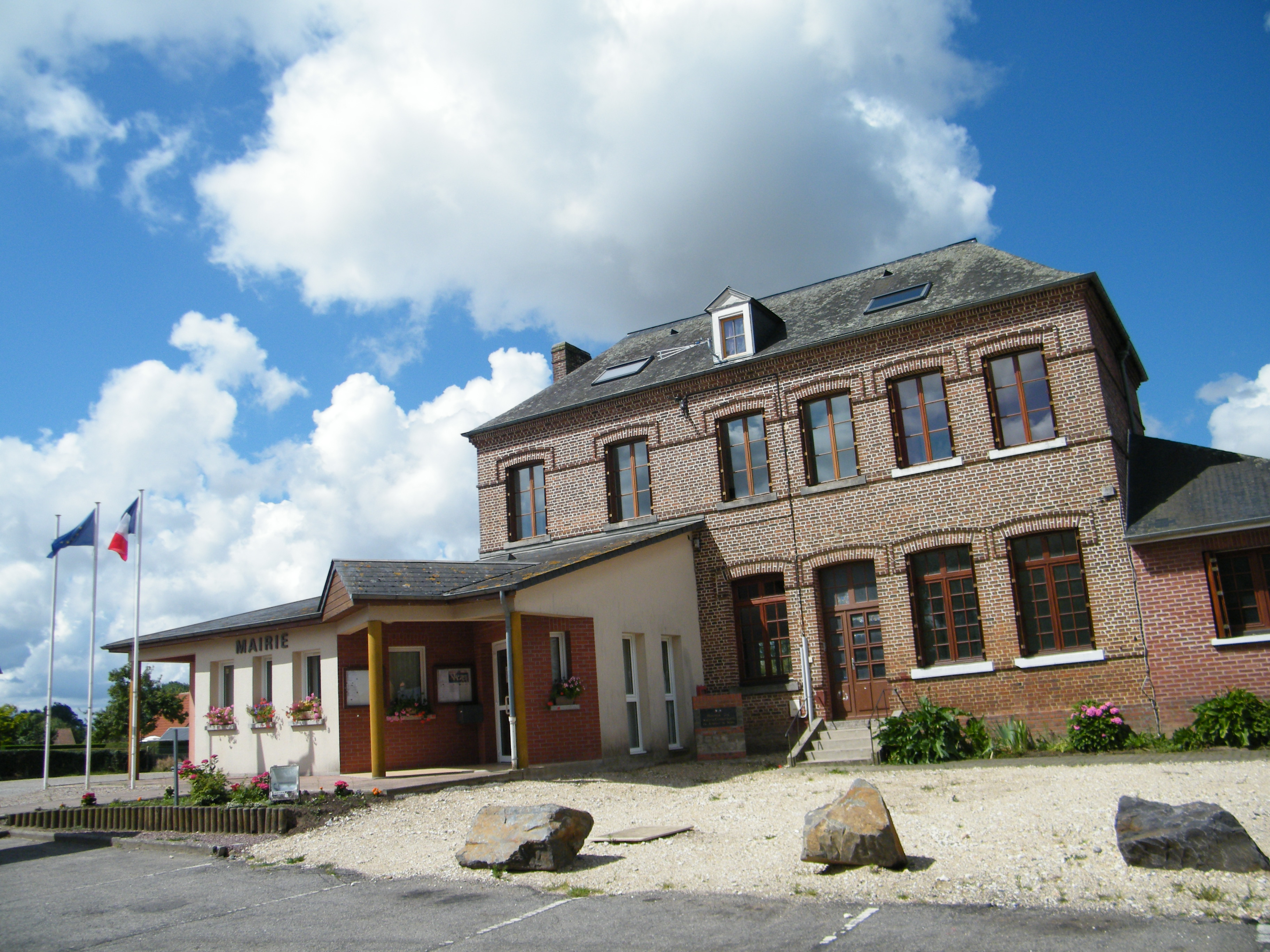
- Town hall
- Location of Auquemesnil
- Location within France Location within Normandy
- Coordinates: 49°56′44″N 1°19′50″E
- Country: France
- Region: Normandy
- Department: Seine-Maritime
- Arrondissement: Dieppe
- Canton: Dieppe-2
- Commune: Petit-Caux
- Area^{1}: 6.34 km^{2} (2.45 sq mi)
- Elevation: 126 m (413 ft)
- Highest elevation: 150 m (490 ft)
- Lowest elevation: 40 m (130 ft)
- Population (2023): 286
  - Density: 45.1/km^{2} (117/sq mi)
- Time zone: UTC+01:00 (CET)
  - Summer (DST): UTC+02:00 (CEST)
- Postal code: 76630
- ^{1} French Land Register data, which excludes lakes, ponds, glaciers > 1 km^{2} (0.386 sq mi or 247 acres) and river estuaries.

Auquemesnil is a former commune in the Seine-Maritime department in the Normandy region in northern France. On 1 January 2016, it was merged into the new commune of Petit-Caux.

== Geography ==
A farming village situated in the Pays de Caux, some 12 miles (19 km) east of Dieppe on the D22 road.

== Heraldry ==
Arms of Auquemesnil	The arms of Auquemesnil are blazoned : Argent, on a bend azure between 2 oaks eradicated vert, 3 stalks of wheat palewise Or.

== Places of interest ==
- The twelfth century church of St.Laurent.

== See also ==
- Communes of the Seine-Maritime department
