= Biville-sur-Mer =

- Part of Petit-Caux
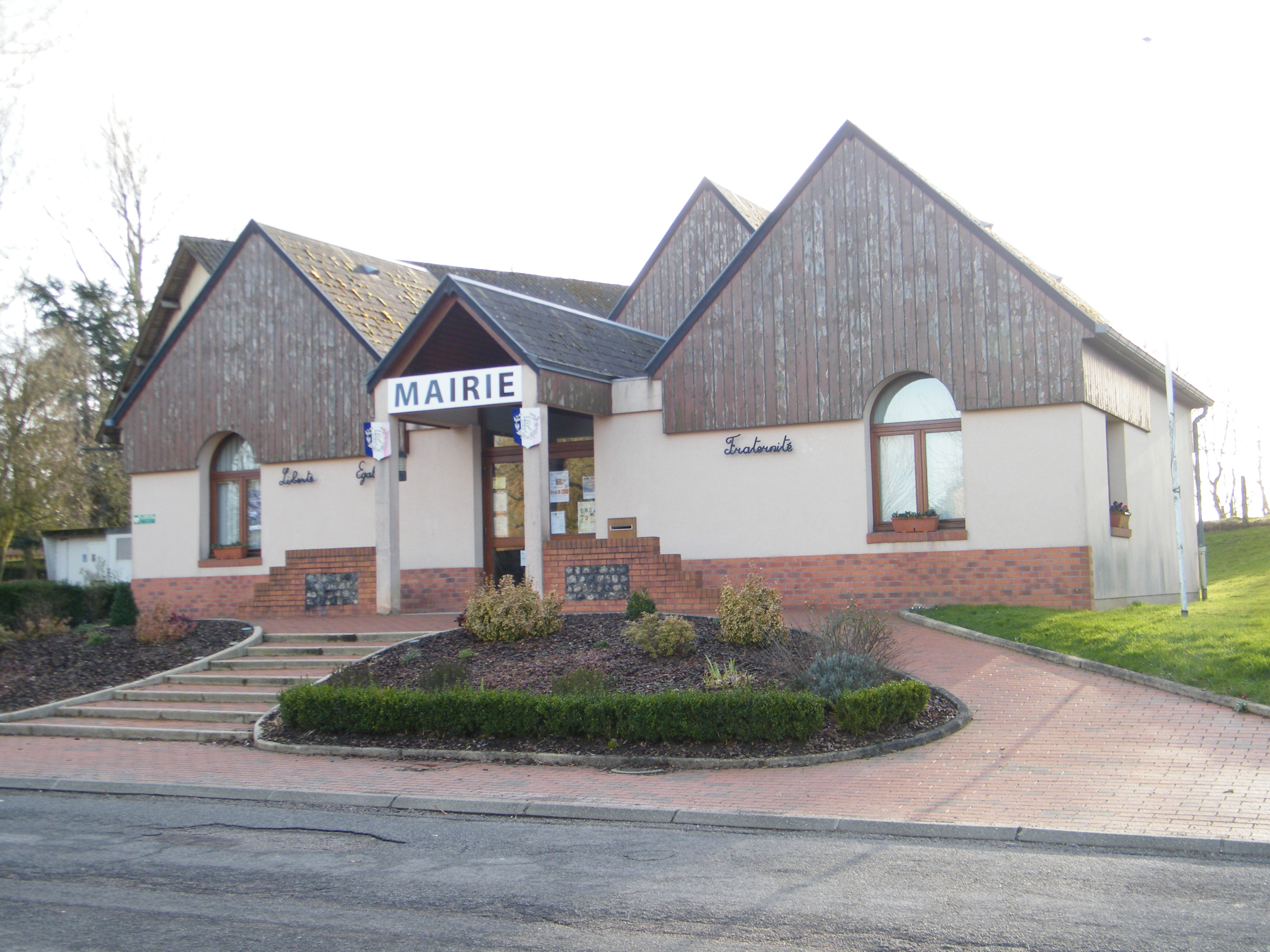
- Biville-sur-Mer Town hall

- Coat of arms
- Location of Biville-sur-Mer
- Location within France Location within Normandy
- Coordinates: 49°58′59″N 1°15′13″E
- Country: France
- Region: Normandy
- Department: Seine-Maritime
- Arrondissement: Dieppe
- Canton: Dieppe-2
- Commune: Petit-Caux
- Area^{1}: 5.3 km^{2} (2.0 sq mi)
- Elevation: 100 m (330 ft)
- Highest elevation: 128 m (420 ft)
- Lowest elevation: 0 m (0 ft)
- Population (2023): 867
  - Density: 160/km^{2} (420/sq mi)
- Time zone: UTC+01:00 (CET)
  - Summer (DST): UTC+02:00 (CEST)
- Postal code: 76630
- ^{1} French Land Register data, which excludes lakes, ponds, glaciers > 1 km^{2} (0.386 sq mi or 247 acres) and river estuaries.

Biville-sur-Mer is a former commune in the Seine-Maritime department in the Normandy region in northern France. On 1 January 2016, it was merged into the new commune of Petit-Caux.

== Geography ==
A farming village in the Pays de Caux, bordered by cliffs overlooking the English Channel, some 8 miles (13 km) northeast of Dieppe, at the junction of the D925 and the D313 roads.

== Heraldry ==
Arms of Biville-sur-Mer	The arms of Biville-sur-Mer are blazoned : Azure, the outline of the local church surrounding 2 swans respectant argent, all upon a base per fess wavy vert and azure. ('base' and 'sea')

== Places of interest ==
- The church of St.Remi, dating from the thirteenth century.

== See also ==
- Communes of the Seine-Maritime department
