= Guilmécourt =

- Part of Petit-Caux
- Location of Guilmécourt
- Location within France Location within Normandy
- Coordinates: 49°58′02″N 1°18′11″E
- Country: France
- Region: Normandy
- Department: Seine-Maritime
- Arrondissement: Dieppe
- Canton: Dieppe-2
- Commune: Petit-Caux
- Area^{1}: 7.92 km^{2} (3.06 sq mi)
- Elevation: 105 m (344 ft)
- Highest elevation: 147 m (482 ft)
- Lowest elevation: 44 m (144 ft)
- Population (2023): 424
  - Density: 53.5/km^{2} (139/sq mi)
- Time zone: UTC+01:00 (CET)
  - Summer (DST): UTC+02:00 (CEST)
- Postal code: 76630
- ^{1} French Land Register data, which excludes lakes, ponds, glaciers > 1 km^{2} (0.386 sq mi or 247 acres) and river estuaries.

Guilmécourt is a former commune in the Seine-Maritime department in the Normandy region in northern France. On 1 January 2016, it was merged into the new commune of Petit-Caux.

== Geography ==
A farming village situated in the Pays de Caux, some 11 miles (18 km) northeast of Dieppe at the junction of the D222, D117 and the D454 roads.

== Heraldry ==
Arms of Guilmécourt	The arms of Guilmécourt are blazoned : Quarterly 1: argent, a mallet vert; 2&3 Azure étincelé, a lion argent; 4: argent, a pinecone vert. (étincelé is an obscure semy of 'sparks' often tiny 'stars' as here)

== Places of interest ==
- The church of St. Waast, dating from the thirteenth century.
- A sixteenth-century stone cross.
- A feudal motte.

== Photos from around Guilmécourt ==
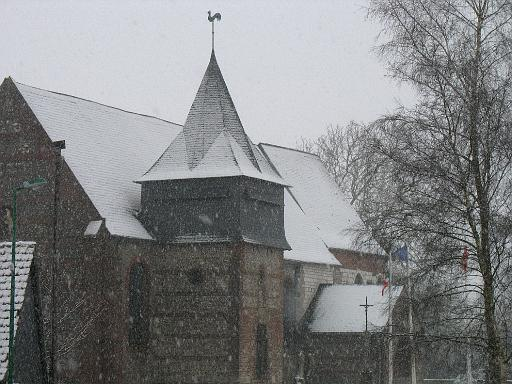
Guilmécourt church

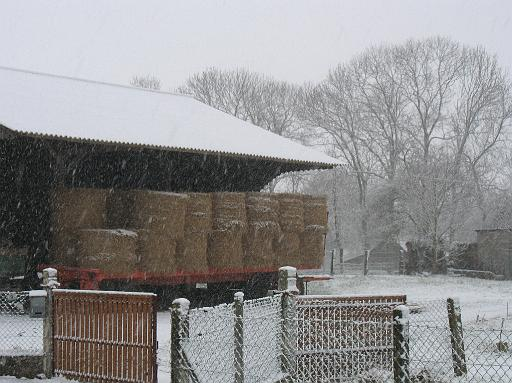
Guilmécourt under snow

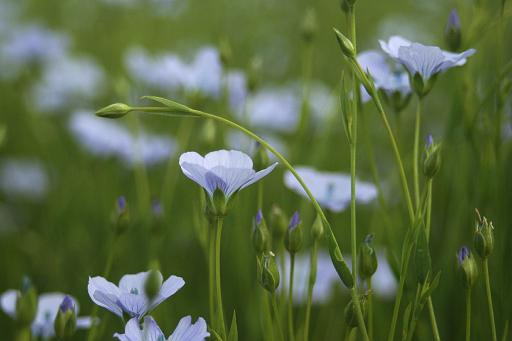
A field of flax

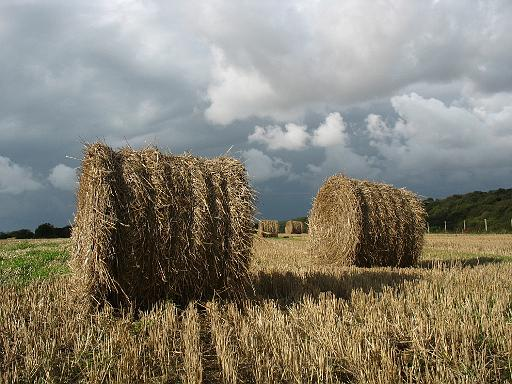
Harvest time

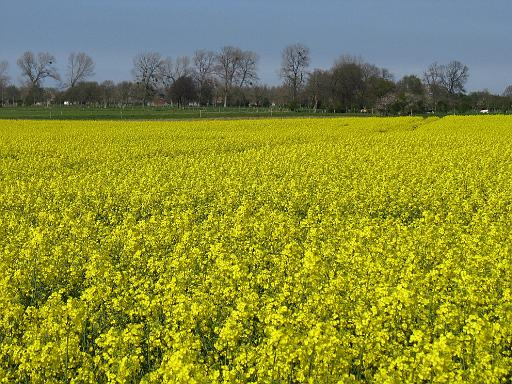
Oil-seed rape fields

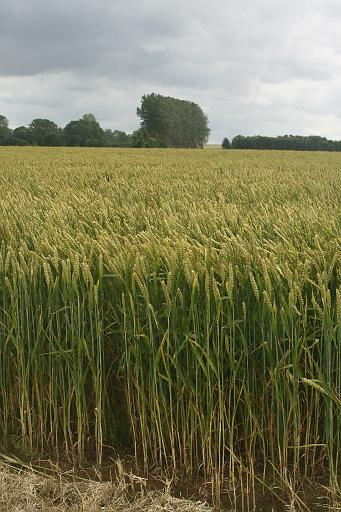
Wheatfields

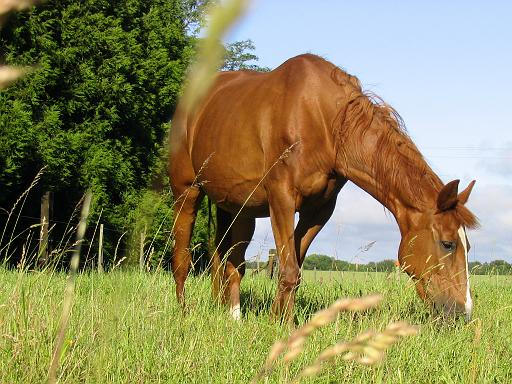
The countryside

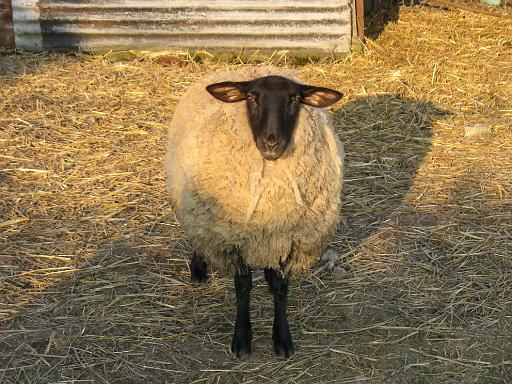
Sheep

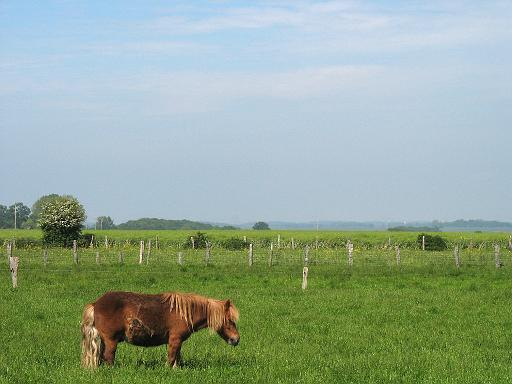
The countryside

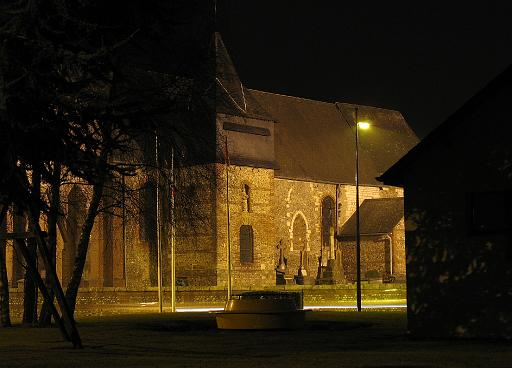
Guilmécourt at night

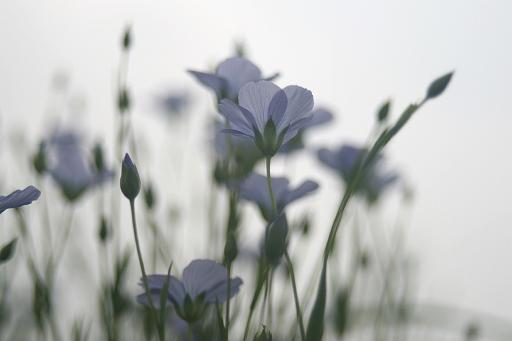
Flower of the flax

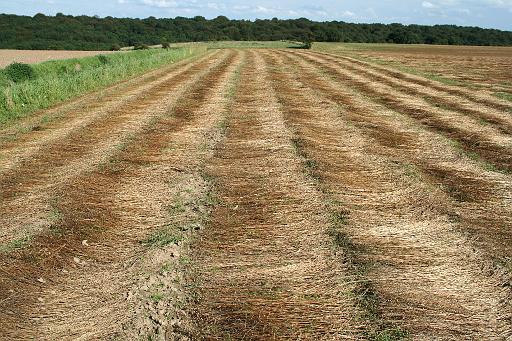
A field of cut flax

== See also ==
- Communes of the Seine-Maritime department
