= Penly =

- Part of Petit-Caux
- Location of Penly
- Location within France Location within Normandy
- Coordinates: 49°58′49″N 1°13′57″E
- Country: France
- Region: Normandy
- Department: Seine-Maritime
- Arrondissement: Dieppe
- Canton: Dieppe-2
- Commune: Petit-Caux
- Area^{1}: 4.06 km^{2} (1.57 sq mi)
- Elevation: 114 m (374 ft)
- Highest elevation: 129 m (423 ft)
- Lowest elevation: 0 m (0 ft)
- Population (2022): 487
  - Density: 120/km^{2} (311/sq mi)
- Time zone: UTC+01:00 (CET)
  - Summer (DST): UTC+02:00 (CEST)
- Postal code: 76630
- ^{1} French Land Register data, which excludes lakes, ponds, glaciers > 1 km^{2} (0.386 sq mi or 247 acres) and river estuaries.

Penly is a former commune in the Seine-Maritime department in the Normandy region in northern France. On 1 January 2016, it was merged into the new commune of Petit-Caux.

== Geography ==
A village of farming and light industry situated by the cliffs of the English Channel in the Pays de Caux at the junction of the D313 and the D925 roads, some 10 miles (16 km) northeast of Dieppe.

== Population ==
Historical population
Year	Pop.	±% p.a.
1962	147	—
1968	143	−0.46%
1975	154	+1.06%
1982	184	+2.58%
1990	306	+6.56%
1999	355	+1.66%
2006	330	−1.04%
2022	487	+2.46%
Source: EHESS and INSEE

== Places of interest ==
- The Penly Nuclear Power Plant on the coast, with 2 reactors of 1300MW each.
- The church of St. Denis, dating from the twelfth century.

== See also ==
- Communes of the Seine-Maritime department
