= Derchigny =

- Part of Petit-Caux
- Coat of arms
- Location of Derchigny
- Location within France Location within Normandy
- Coordinates: 49°56′19″N 1°11′19″E
- Country: France
- Region: Normandy
- Department: Seine-Maritime
- Arrondissement: Dieppe
- Canton: Dieppe-2
- Commune: Petit-Caux
- Area^{1}: 4.75 km^{2} (1.83 sq mi)
- Elevation: 100 m (330 ft)
- Highest elevation: 116 m (381 ft)
- Lowest elevation: 40 m (130 ft)
- Population (2023): 602
  - Density: 127/km^{2} (328/sq mi)
- Time zone: UTC+01:00 (CET)
  - Summer (DST): UTC+02:00 (CEST)
- Postal code: 76370
- ^{1} French Land Register data, which excludes lakes, ponds, glaciers > 1 km^{2} (0.386 sq mi or 247 acres) and river estuaries.

Derchigny is a former commune in the Seine-Maritime department in the Normandy region in north-western France. On 1 January 2016, it was merged into the new commune of Petit-Caux. The local name is Derchigny-Graincourt as the commune resulted from the merger of two former communes, Derchigny and Graincourt, in 1822.

== Geography ==
A farming village situated in the Pays de Caux, some 5 miles (8.0 km) east of Dieppe, at the junction of the D 54 and the D 925 roads.

== Heraldry ==
Arms of Derchigny	The arms of Derchigny are blazoned : Vert, a bend sinister argent between a castle and in base a coffee leaf bendwise sinister.

== Places of interest ==
- The church of St.Martin, dating from the eighteenth century.
- The church of St. Valery, dating from the eleventh century.
- The eighteenth-century château de Wargemont (made famous by the owners, the Berard family, being patrons of Auguste Renoir).
- The château de Derchigny, dating from the eighteenth century.

== See also ==
- Communes of the Seine-Maritime department
