= Belleville-sur-Mer =

- Part of Petit-Caux
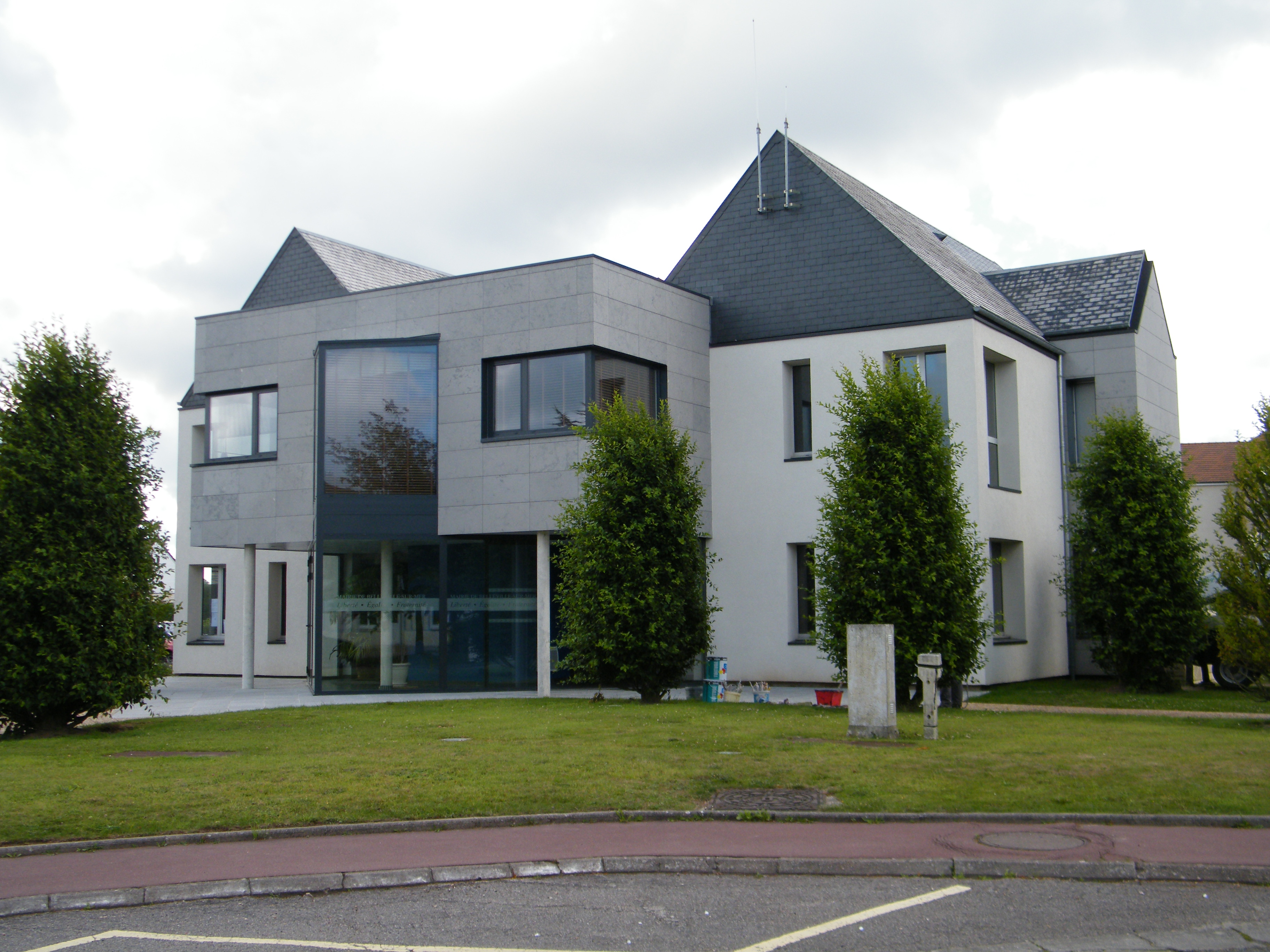
- Town hall
- Location of Belleville-sur-Mer
- Location within France Location within Normandy
- Coordinates: 49°57′00″N 1°09′45″E
- Country: France
- Region: Normandy
- Department: Seine-Maritime
- Arrondissement: Dieppe
- Canton: Dieppe-2
- Commune: Petit-Caux
- Area^{1}: 3.07 km^{2} (1.19 sq mi)
- Elevation: 92 m (302 ft)
- Highest elevation: 103 m (338 ft)
- Lowest elevation: 0 m (0 ft)
- Population (2023): 981
  - Density: 320/km^{2} (828/sq mi)
- Time zone: UTC+01:00 (CET)
  - Summer (DST): UTC+02:00 (CEST)
- Postal code: 76370
- ^{1} French Land Register data, which excludes lakes, ponds, glaciers > 1 km^{2} (0.386 sq mi or 247 acres) and river estuaries.

Belleville-sur-Mer is a former commune in the Seine-Maritime department in the Normandy region in northern France. On 1 January 2016, it was merged into the new commune of Petit-Caux.

== Geography ==
A farming village in the Pays de Caux, situated on the coast of the English Channel, some 4 miles (6.4 km) northeast of Dieppe, at the junction of the D113 and D113e roads.

== Heraldry ==
Arms of Belleville-sur-Mer	The arms of Belleville-sur-Mer are blazoned : Azure, a saltire between 4 eagle heads contourny argent.

== Places of interest ==
- The church of Notre-Dame, dating from the thirteenth century.

== See also ==
- Communes of the Seine-Maritime department
