= Assigny, Seine-Maritime =

Assigny
- Part of Petit-Caux
- Location of Assigny
- Location within France Location within Normandy
- Coordinates: 49°59′11″N 1°17′36″E
- Country: France
- Region: Normandy
- Department: Seine-Maritime
- Arrondissement: Dieppe
- Canton: Dieppe-2
- Commune: Petit-Caux
- Area^{1}: 6.05 km^{2} (2.34 sq mi)
- Elevation: 100 m (330 ft)
- Highest elevation: 108 m (354 ft)
- Lowest elevation: 55 m (180 ft)
- Population (2023): 379
  - Density: 62.6/km^{2} (162/sq mi)
- Time zone: UTC+01:00 (CET)
  - Summer (DST): UTC+02:00 (CEST)
- Postal code: 76630
- ^{1} French Land Register data, which excludes lakes, ponds, glaciers > 1 km^{2} (0.386 sq mi or 247 acres) and river estuaries.

Assigny is a former commune in the Seine-Maritime department in the Normandy region in north-western France. On 1 January 2016, it was merged into the new commune of Petit-Caux.

== Geography ==
A farming village in the Petit Caux district, situated some 10 miles (16 km) northeast of Dieppe, at the junction of the D222 and D113 roads.

== Heraldry ==
Arms of Assigny	The arms of Assigny are blazoned : Azure, on a fess Or between 2 eagles and a crowned lion argent, a pinecone reversed between 2 mallets gules.

== Places of interest ==
- The church of St. Médard, dating from the twelfth century.
- The château dating from the sixteenth century
- A wind farm, on the outskirts of the commune.
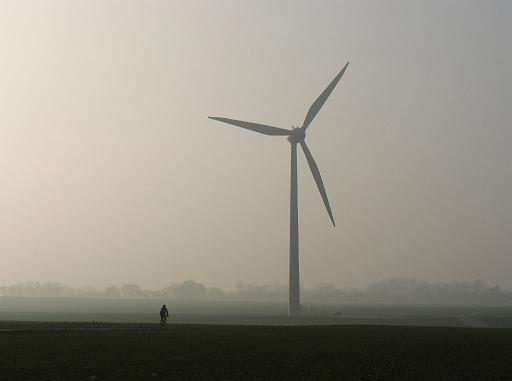
The windmills of Assigny

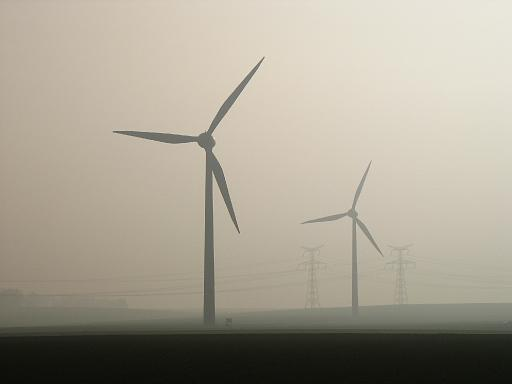

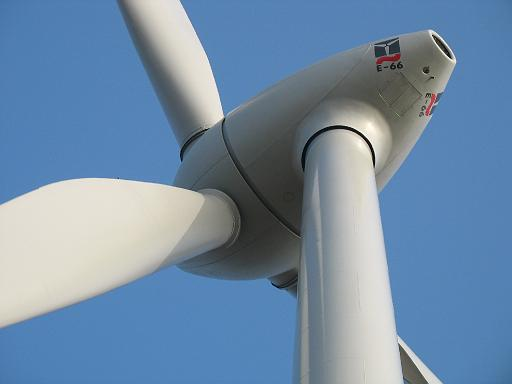

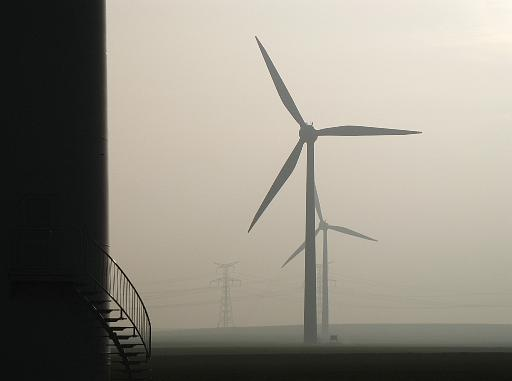

== See also ==
- Communes of the Seine-Maritime department
