= Bracquemont =

- Part of Petit-Caux
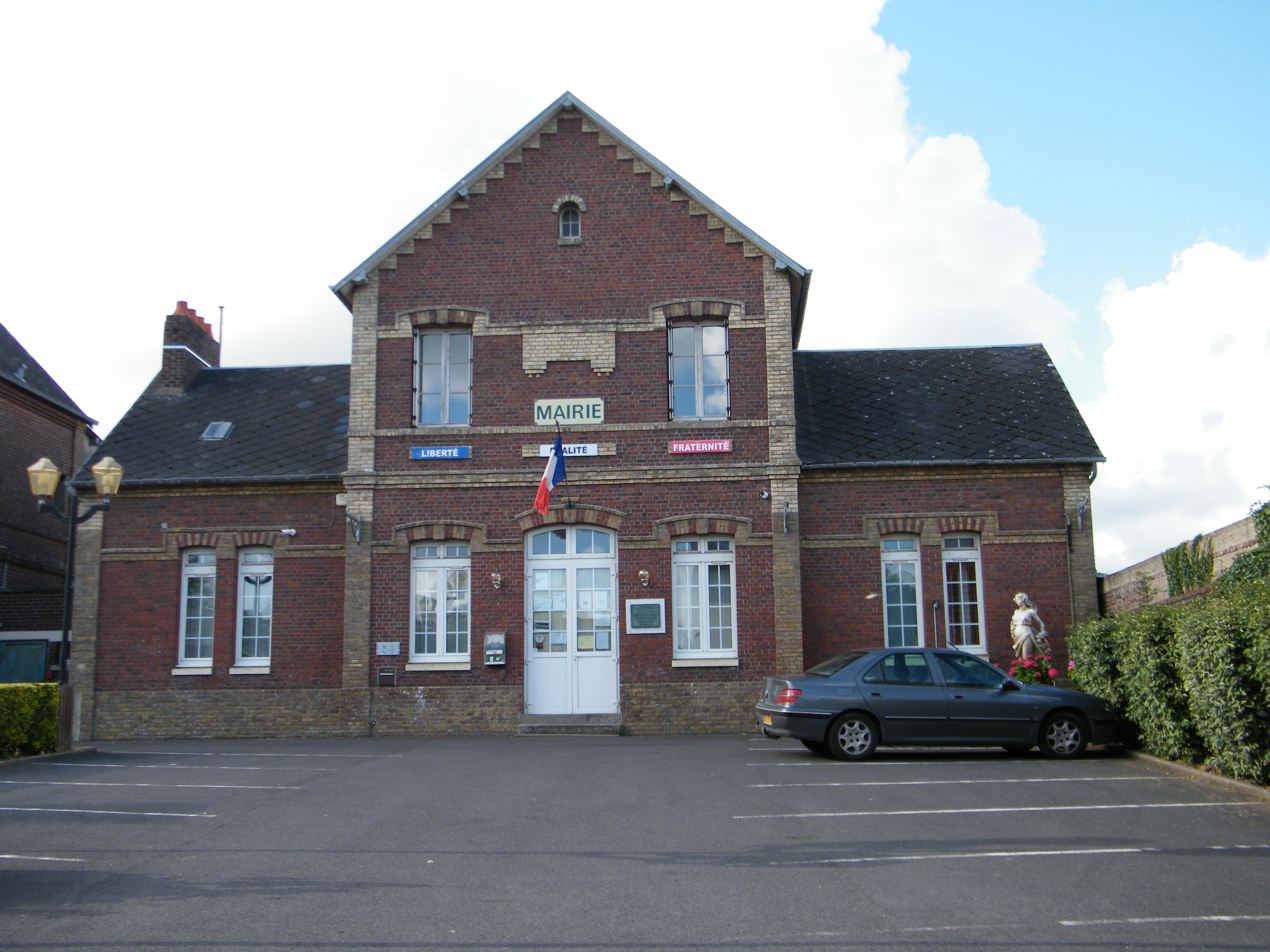
- Bracquemont Town hall
- Location of Bracquemont
- Location within France Location within Normandy
- Coordinates: 49°56′29″N 1°08′46″E
- Country: France
- Region: Normandy
- Department: Seine-Maritime
- Arrondissement: Dieppe
- Canton: Dieppe-2
- Commune: Petit-Caux
- Area^{1}: 4.84 km^{2} (1.87 sq mi)
- Elevation: 85 m (279 ft)
- Highest elevation: 97 m (318 ft)
- Lowest elevation: 0 m (0 ft)
- Population (2023): 845
  - Density: 175/km^{2} (452/sq mi)
- Time zone: UTC+01:00 (CET)
  - Summer (DST): UTC+02:00 (CEST)
- Postal code: 76370
- ^{1} French Land Register data, which excludes lakes, ponds, glaciers > 1 km^{2} (0.386 sq mi or 247 acres) and river estuaries.

Bracquemont (French pronunciation: [bʁakmɔ̃]) is a former commune in the Seine-Maritime department in the Normandy region in northern France. On 1 January 2016, it was merged into the new commune of Petit-Caux.

== Geography ==
A farming village situated in the Pays de Caux, 1 mile (1.6 km) east of the neighbouring town of Dieppe, at the junction of the D100 and the D113 roads. Huge cliffs, overlooking the English Channel, form the commune's northern border

=== Heraldry ===
Arms of Bracquemont	The arms of Bracquemont are blazoned : Argent, a chevron and in canton a mallet sable.

== Places of interest ==
- The church of Notre-Dame, dating from the seventeenth century.
- A pre-Roman archaeology site – the “Cité des Limes”.

== See also ==
- Communes of the Seine-Maritime department
