= Tocqueville-sur-Eu =

- Part of Petit-Caux
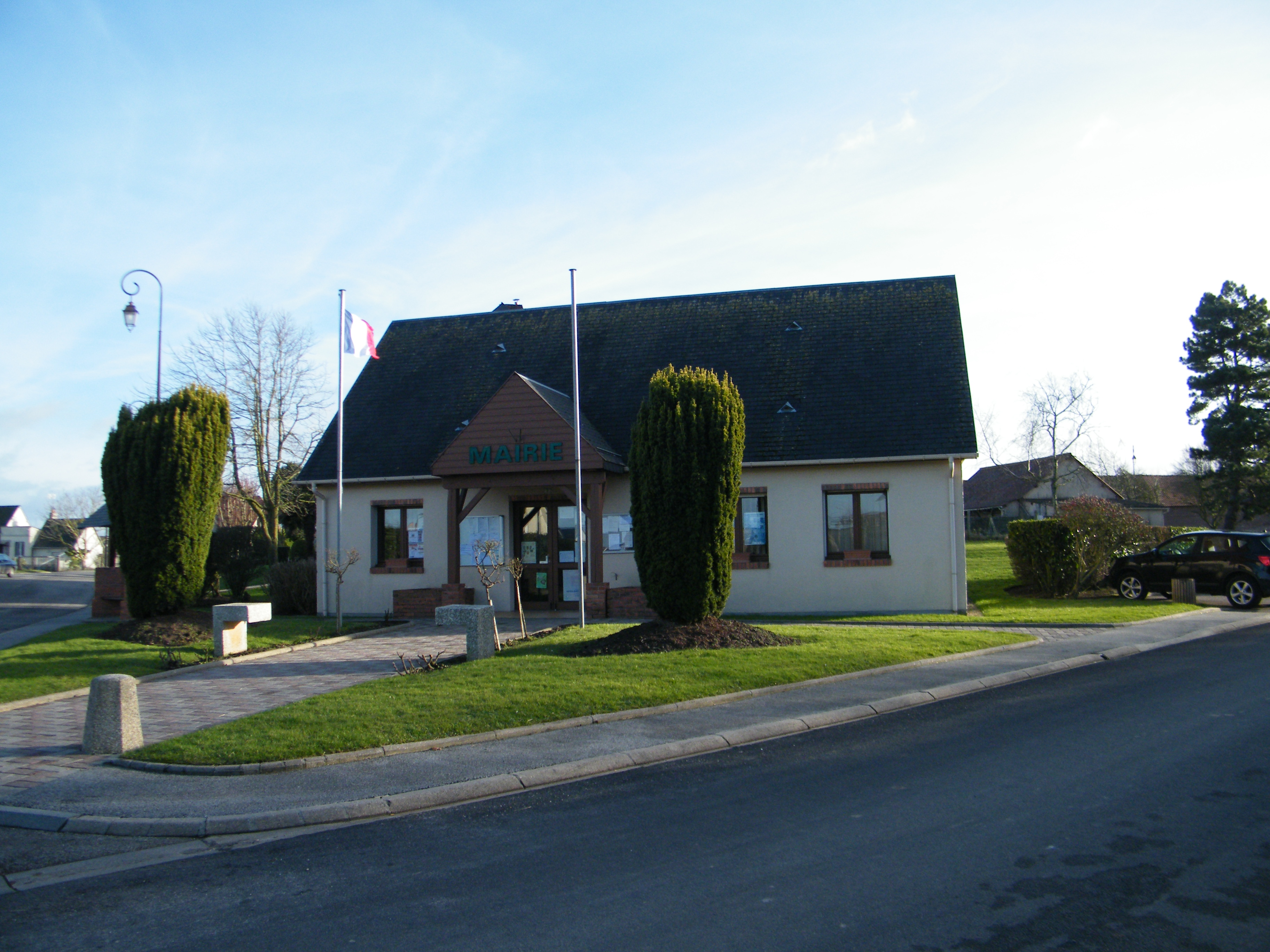
- Town hall
- Location of Tocqueville-sur-Eu
- Location within France Location within Normandy
- Coordinates: 50°00′13″N 1°17′04″E
- Country: France
- Region: Normandy
- Department: Seine-Maritime
- Arrondissement: Dieppe
- Canton: Dieppe-2
- Commune: Petit-Caux
- Area^{1}: 3.6 km^{2} (1.4 sq mi)
- Elevation: 82 m (269 ft)
- Highest elevation: 97 m (318 ft)
- Lowest elevation: 0 m (0 ft)
- Population (2022): 216
  - Density: 60/km^{2} (160/sq mi)
- Time zone: UTC+01:00 (CET)
  - Summer (DST): UTC+02:00 (CEST)
- Postal code: 76910
- ^{1} French Land Register data, which excludes lakes, ponds, glaciers > 1 km^{2} (0.386 sq mi or 247 acres) and river estuaries.

Tocqueville-sur-Eu is a former commune in the Seine-Maritime department in the Normandy region in northern France. On 1 January 2016, it was merged into the new commune of Petit-Caux.

== Geography ==
A small farming village situated in the Pays de Caux and on the coast of the English Channel, some 12 miles (19 km) northeast of Dieppe on the D925 road. Here, huge chalk cliffs rise up from the pebble beach.

== Population ==
Historical population
Year	Pop.	±% p.a.
1962	159	—
1968	143	−1.75%
1975	135	−0.82%
1982	146	+1.13%
1990	156	+0.83%
1999	153	−0.22%
2006	186	+2.83%
2022	216	+0.94%
Source: EHESS and INSEE

== Places of interest ==
- Trinity church, with vestiges dating from the twelfth century.

== See also ==
- Communes of the Seine-Maritime department
