= Saint-Quentin-au-Bosc =

- Part of Petit-Caux
- Location of Saint-Quentin-au-Bosc
- Location within France Location within Normandy
- Coordinates: 49°56′23″N 1°19′22″E
- Country: France
- Region: Normandy
- Department: Seine-Maritime
- Arrondissement: Dieppe
- Canton: Dieppe-2
- Commune: Petit-Caux
- Area^{1}: 3.5 km^{2} (1.4 sq mi)
- Elevation: 129 m (423 ft)
- Highest elevation: 153 m (502 ft)
- Lowest elevation: 98 m (322 ft)
- Population (2022): 107
  - Density: 31/km^{2} (79/sq mi)
- Time zone: UTC+01:00 (CET)
  - Summer (DST): UTC+02:00 (CEST)
- Postal code: 76630
- ^{1} French Land Register data, which excludes lakes, ponds, glaciers > 1 km^{2} (0.386 sq mi or 247 acres) and river estuaries.

Saint-Quentin-au-Bosc is a former commune in the Seine-Maritime department in the Normandy region in northern France. On 1 January 2016, it was merged into the new commune of Petit-Caux.

== Geography ==
A very small farming village situated in the Pays de Caux, some 9 miles (14 km) east of Dieppe at the junction of the D22, the D26 and the D127 roads.

== Population ==
Historical population
Year	Pop.	±% p.a.
1962	142	—
1968	147	+0.58%
1975	142	−0.49%
1982	125	−1.81%
1990	101	−2.63%
1999	88	−1.52%
2006	86	−0.33%
2022	107	+1.37%
Source: EHESS and INSEE

== Places of interest ==
- The church of St. Quentin, built in the 19th century.
- The seventeenth century chateau.

== See also ==
- Communes of the Seine-Maritime department
