= 1908 French Grand Prix =

Race details
- Date: July 7, 1908
- Official name: Grand Prix de l'Automobile Club de France
- Location: Dieppe, France
- Course: Public roads
- Course length: 76.989 km (47.840 miles)
- Distance: 10 laps, 769.889 km (478.400 miles)

Fastest lap
| Driver | (Germany) Otto Salzer | Mercedes |
- Time: 36:31.0

Podium
| First | (Germany) Christian Lautenschlager | Mercedes |
| Second | (France) Victor Hémery | Benz |
| Third | (France) René Hanriot | Benz |

The 1908 French Grand Prix was a Grand Prix motor race held at Dieppe on 7 July 1908.

The race was won by Christian Lautenschlager driving a Mercedes.

== Formula Changes ==
The race was run under a new formula agreed in Ostend in 1907. There was no fuel consumption limit, but the cars had a minimum weight of 1100 kilograms, and a maximum cylinder bore of 155 millimetres. This formula differed from the regulations in place for the American Vanderbilt Cup series, which discouraged American manufacturers from entering the race. Lewis Strang drove the single American entrant, the Thomas Flyer. D. Napier & Son cars were disqualified from the race due to their use of Rudge-Whitworth center locking hubs, which the organizers believed were unsafe.

== The Race ==
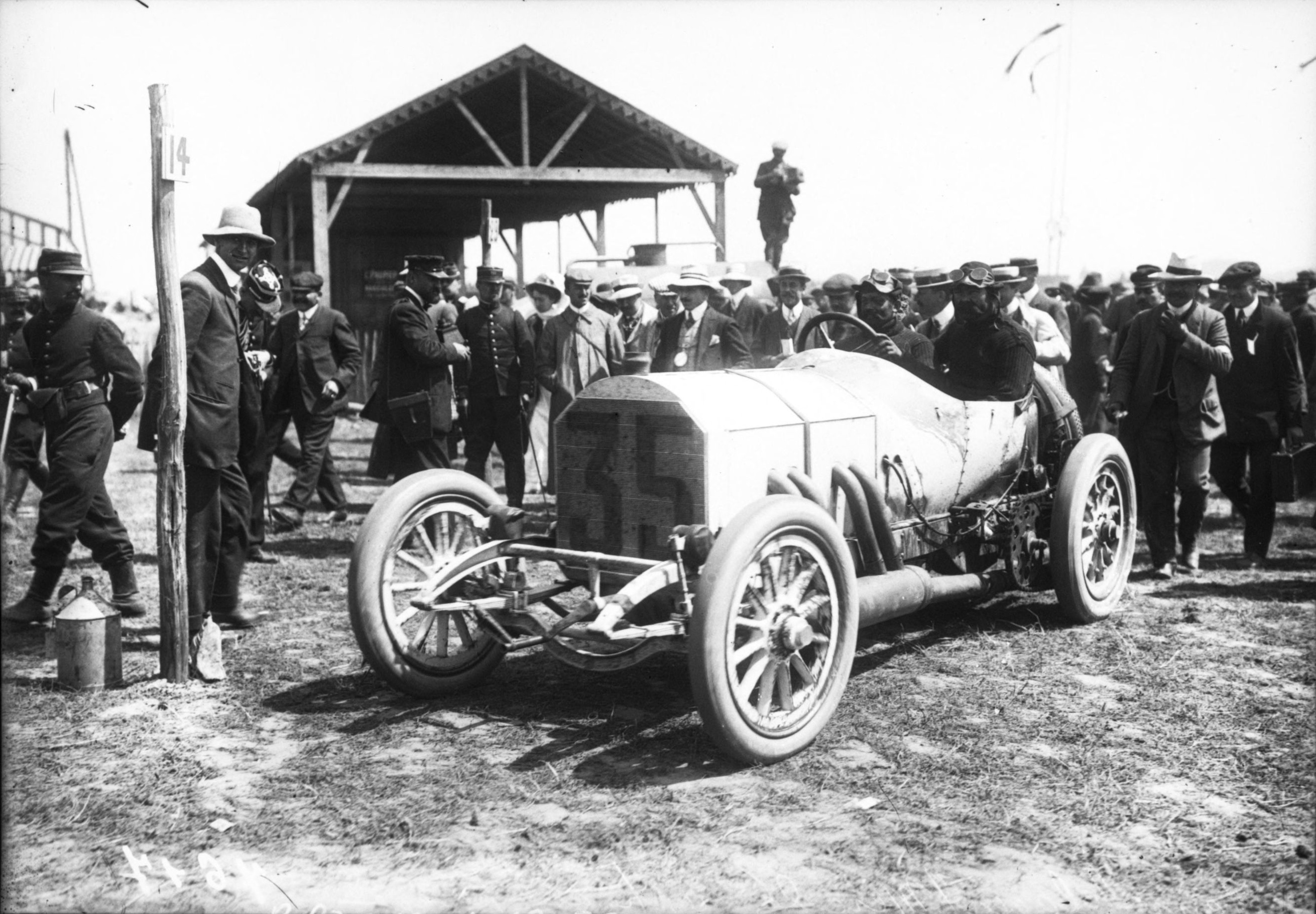
Race winner Christian Lautenschlager in his Mercedes

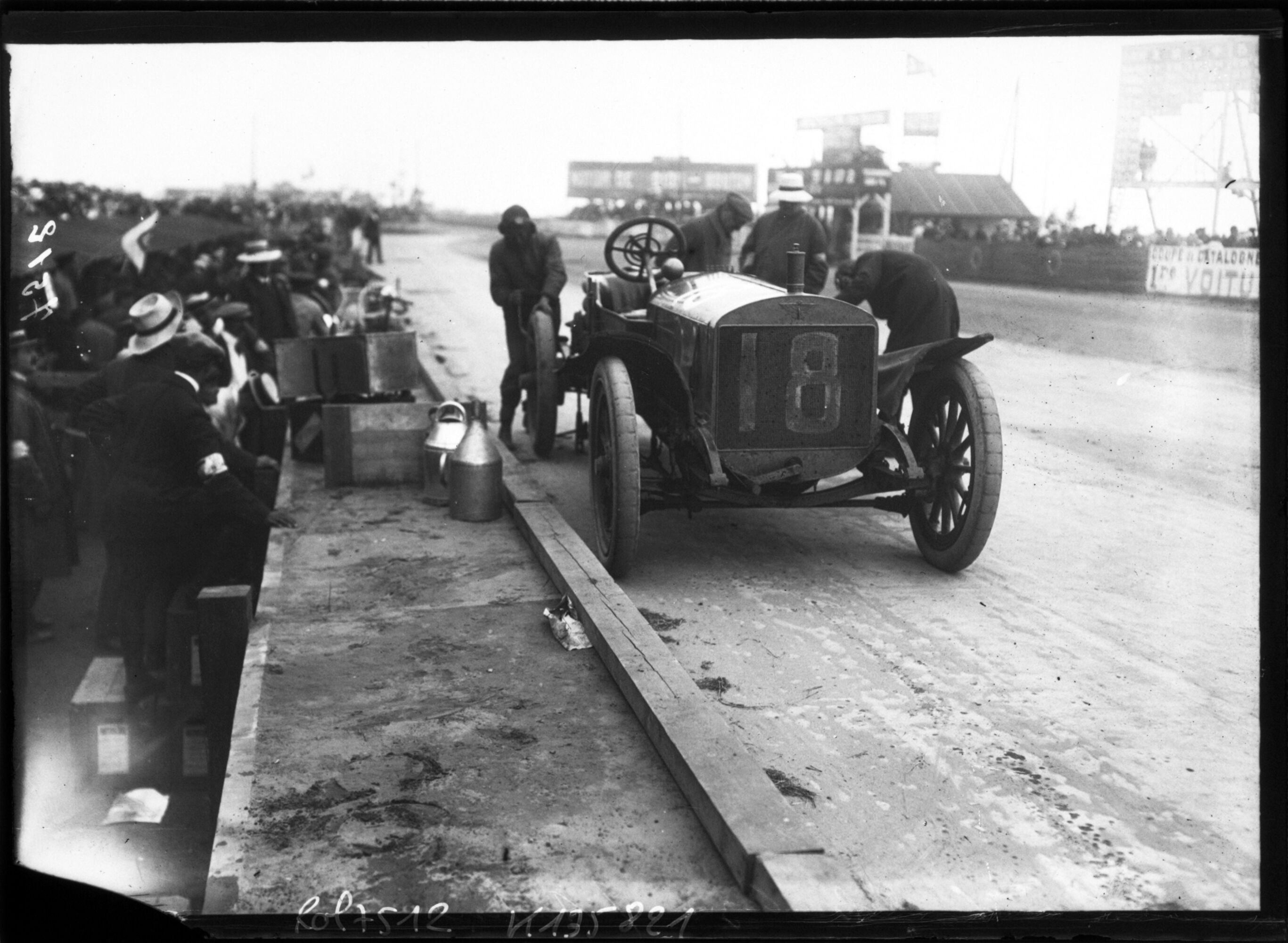
The Austin of JTC Moore-Brabazon placed 18th

Christian Lautenschlager won the race in his Mercedes finishing nearly nine minutes ahead of Victor Hémery's Benz. Lautenschlager's average speed for the race was 69.045 mph (111.117 km/h). Otto Salzer set fastest lap in his Mercedes, with an average speed of over 78 mph (126 km/h). The race was notable for tragic reasons. Henri Cissac's car lost a tyre and rolled, killing Cissac and Jules Schaube, his riding mechanic. This was the first fatal accident in Grand Prix history.

== Classification ==
| Pos | No | Driver | Car | Laps | Time/Retired |
|---|---|---|---|---|---|
| 1 | 35 | (Germany) Christian Lautenschlager | Mercedes | 10 | 6:55:43.8 |
| 2 | 6 | (France) Victor Hémery | Benz 150 hp | | +8:40.2 |
| 3 | 23 | (France) René Hanriot | Benz 150 hp | | +9:29.2 |
| 4 | 11 | (France) Victor Rigal | Clément-Bayard | | +34:52.8 |
| 5 | 2 | (Germany) Willy Pöge | Mercedes | | +36:47.2 |
| 6 | 27 | (Germany) Carl Jörns | Opel | | +43.56.2 |
| 7 | 39 | (Germany) Fritz Erle | Benz | | +56:48.0 |
| 8 | 37 | (Russia) Sergey Dimitriewich | Renault | | +1:07:39.0 |
| 9 | 16 | (United States) George Heath | Panhard-Levassor | | +1:09:03.0 |
| 10 | 49 | (Belgium) Perpère | Germain | | +1:12:34.4 |
| 11 | 12 | (Italy) Alessandro Cagno | Itala | | +1:21:23.0 |
| 12 | 28 | (France) Fernand Gabriel | Clément-Bayard | | +1:25:11.2 |
| 13 | 36 | (France) Courtade | Motobloc | | +1:26:10.0 |
| 14 | 20 | (France) Pierre Garcet | Motobloc | | +1:33:23.0 |
| 15 | 21 | (France) Gustave Caillois | Renault | | +1:33:23.4 |
| 16 | 14 | (Belgium) Camille Jenatzy | Mors | | +1:38:11.8 |
| 17 | 31 | Landon | Mors | | +1:52:47.4 |
| 18 | 18 | (United Kingdom) JTC Moore-Brabazon | Austin | | +1:56:17.0 |
| 19 | 1 | (United Kingdom) Dario Resta | Austin | | +2:00:17.4 |
| 20 | 29 | (France) Henri Fournier | Itala | | +2:00:47.4 |
| 21 | 10 | (Germany) Friedrich Opel | Opel | | +2:21:38.6 |
| 22 | 17 | (France) François Degrais | Germain | | +2:27:01.0 |
| 23 | 32 | (France) Henry Farman | Panhard-Levassor | | +2:38:07.0 |
| Ret | 8 | (France) Léon Théry | Brasier | 9 | Wheel |
| Ret | 41 | (France) Paul Bablot | Brasier | 9 | Magneto |
| Ret | 9 | (France) Emile Stricker | Porthos | 9 | |
| Ret | 43 | Michel | Opel | 9 | Radiator |
| Ret | 48 | (France) Henri Cissac | Panhard-Levassor | 8 | Fatal crash |
| Ret | 13 | (United Kingdom) Pryce Harrison | Weigel | 5 | Crash |
| Ret | 44 | (Belgium) Lucien Hautvast | Clément-Bayard | 5 | Wheel |
| Ret | 34 | (United Kingdom) Warwick Wright | Austin | 4 | Engine |
| Ret | 33 | (Belgium) François Marie Roch-Brault | Germain | 4 | |
| Ret | 15 | (United States) Lewis Strang | Thomas | 4 | Clutch |
| Ret | 40 | (France) Louis Wagner | Fiat | 3 | Gearbox |
| Ret | 24 | (Italy) Felice Nazzaro | Fiat | 3 | Engine |
| Ret | 3 | (France) Pierron | Motobloc | 3 | Crash |
| Ret | 30 | (United Kingdom) Gregor Laxen | Weigel | 3 | Crash |
| Ret | 25 | (France) Paul Baras | Brasier | 3 | Engine |
| Ret | 38 | (Italy) Ferdinando Minoia | Lorraine-Dietrich | 3 | Magneto |
| Ret | 5 | (Belgium) Arthur Duray | Lorraine-Dietrich | 2 | Clutch |
| Ret | 4 | Ferenc Szisz | Renault | 2 | Wheels |
| Ret | 19 | (Germany) Otto Salzer | Mercedes | 2 | Wheel |
| Ret | 42 | (France) Jules Simon | Porthos | 2 | Water pump |
| Ret | 7 | (Italy) Vincenzo Lancia | Fiat | 1 | Engine |
| Ret | 22 | (France) Henri Rougier | Lorraine-Dietrich | 1 | Magneto |
| Ret | 46 | (United Kingdom) Shannon | Weigel | 1 | Steering |
| Ret | 45 | (Italy) Giovanni Piacenza | Itala | 1 | Gearbox |
| Ret | 26 | (France) J. Gaubert | Porthos img | 0 | Water pump |

Grand Prix Race
| Previous race: None | 1908 Grand Prix season Grandes Épreuves | Next race: None |
| Previous race: 1907 French Grand Prix | French Grand Prix | Next race: 1912 French Grand Prix |
