= Alfred Mays-Smith =

English car manufacturer

Sir Alfred Samuel Mays-Smith was an English car manufacturer. From 1920 to 1922 he was chairman of the Society of Motor Manufacturers and Traders. In the 1922 New Year Honours, Mays-Smith was knighted in recognition for important services to the Disposal and Liquidation Commission.

In 1913 Mays-Smith was a director of Mossay and Co. alongside Alfred Makower, Paul Mossay and A. Berkeley.
