= Makower =

Makower is a surname. Notable people with the surname include:

- Alfred Makower (1876–1941), electrical engineer
- Helen Makower (1910–1998), British economist
- Josh Makower (fl. from 1985), American biomedical engineer and physician
