= Henri Cissac =

French racing cyclist and Grand Prix driver (1877–1908)

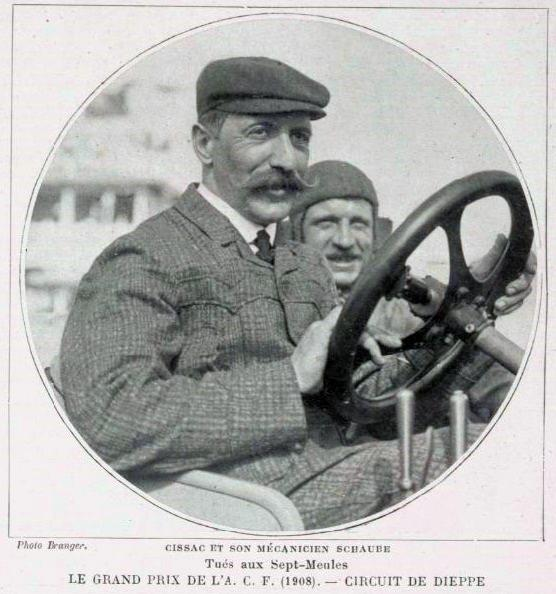
- With mechanic Schaube at the 1908 G.P.
- Born: 15 July 1877 Ivry-sur-Seine, France
- Died: 7 July 1908 (aged 30) Sept-Meules, France

Henri Cissac (15 July 1877 – 7 July 1908) was a French racing cyclist, motorcyclist, and racing driver, notable as being the first driver to be killed at a Grand Prix meeting.

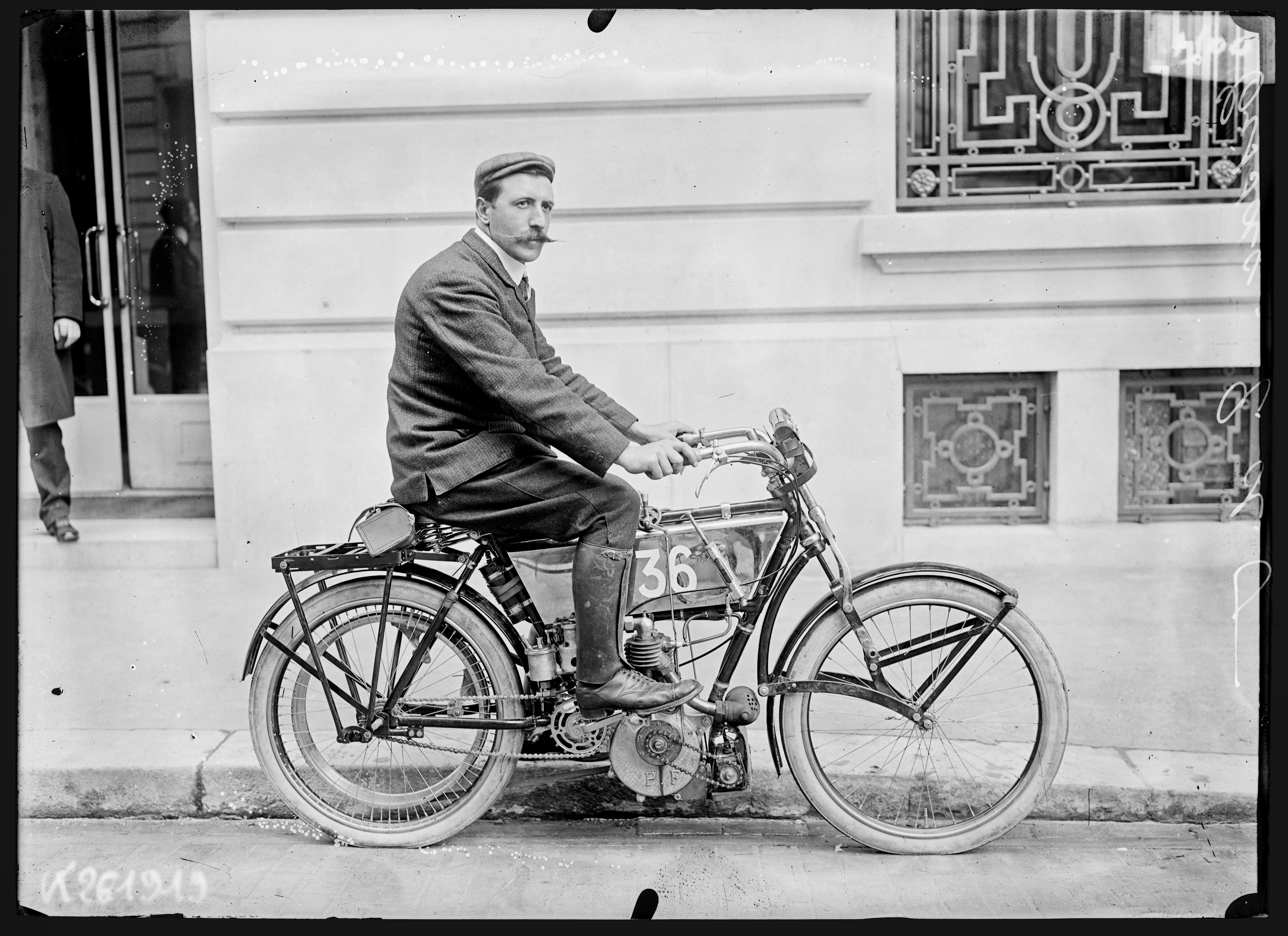
Cissac ready to take part in the 1906 Tour de France Motorcycliste

== Career ==
Cissac started his sporting career as a racing cyclist in 1893 (at the Paris-Trouville race), famously winning a match race against the English "crack" Platt-Betts in 1896. By 1898 he was considered one of the best middle-distance riders in the world and lay claim to a world championship.

=== Motorcycle records ===
Cissac soon graduated to motorcycle racing, although a serious injury after a crash kept him away from racing for a while; the time away gave him time to set up a find for injured motorcyclists, and he also became a trainer for cycling and motorcycling teams. In 1904, at the Vélodrome d'Hiver, riding a Peugeot, he won the "brassard" from Marius Thé, marking him as French champion, which he then successfully defended from a number of challenges. He also acted as pacemaker for cyclists seeking to break endurance records

Cissac set a new motorcycle world record on his Peugeot at the Brighton Speed Trials in July 1905, and two weeks later broke his own record at Blackpool, leaving the record at 87.38mph. In 1906, still faithful to Peugeot, he won the Tour de France Motocycliste, beating future Grand Prix driver Giosuè Giuppone into second place.

=== Motor racing career ===
In 1907, Cissac switched to four wheels, and at that year's Coupe des Voiturettes, driving an Alcyon, finished a remarkable fourth out of the 33 finishers; the magazine L'Auto-Vélo rated him as one of the top three drivers of the race, alongside Victor Rigal and Georges Sizaire, and called for one of the manufacturers to give him a Grand Prix drive. He followed this up with a second on the Alcyon at the Corsa Vetturette Torino in January 1908, behind Giuppone.

=== Death ===
For the 1908 French Grand Prix, he was recruited by Panhard-Levassor, which meant he could not represent Alcyon in the Coupe des Voiturettes. Cissac was the 48th driver to start in the big race itself. He struggled on the first lap, completing it 47th and last, but had moved up to sixth place on the ninth of ten laps. At Sept-Meules, between the village of Fresnois and the town of Londinières, a tyre blew out, and the rubber wrapped around the car's chain drive. This sent the car into a roll, and both Cissac and riding mechanic Jules Schaube were killed. Cissac's mother sued Panhard for damages in negligence, but was only awarded a statutory lump sum, the French appellate court deeming Cissac's death to have been a workplace accident.

== External sites ==
- Cissac demonstrating the correct way to ride a motorcycle on the road
