= Société Franco-Belge =

Franco-Belgian engineering firm

- Industry: Rail vehicle manufacturing
- Predecessor: Compagnie Belge pour la Construction de Machines et de Matériels de Chemins de Fer (1862–1881)
- Founded: 1881
- Successor: Société Anglo-Franco-Belge de Matériel de Chemins de Fer (1927–64) Société Franco-Belge a Raismes, later Soferval (1927–82) since 1982 Alstom subsidiary
- Headquarters: Paris, France
- Key people: Charles Evrard
- Products: Locomotives, carriages, wagons

The Société Franco-Belge was a Franco-Belgian engineering firm that specialised in the construction of railway vehicles and their components and accessories. The company originated in 1859 as the Belgian firm Compagnie Belge pour la Construction de Machines et de Matériels de Chemins de Fer, founded by Charles Evrard. The company expanded its share capital in 1881 forming a new firm Société Anonyme Franco-Belge pour la Construction de Machines et de Matériel de Chemins de Fer and constructed a factory in Raismes (Valenciennes) in the Département Nord in France.

In 1927, the company split into a Belgian (Société Anglo-Franco-Belge, SAFB) and a French company (Société Franco-Belge).

The company's factories were occupied during World War I, during which period it was used as a sawmill, and during World War II, during which period it manufactured Kriegslokomotives. SAFB merged with the Ateliers Germain in 1964; the company closed in 1968 due to lack of work.

The Franco-Belge (based in Raismes) was acquired by Alstom in 1982, as of 2012 the factory Alstom Petite-Forêt, Valenciennes operates as an Alstom subsidiary, specialising in metros, trams and double deck trains. A test track Centre d'Essais Ferroviaire is located west of the Raismes factory.

== History ==
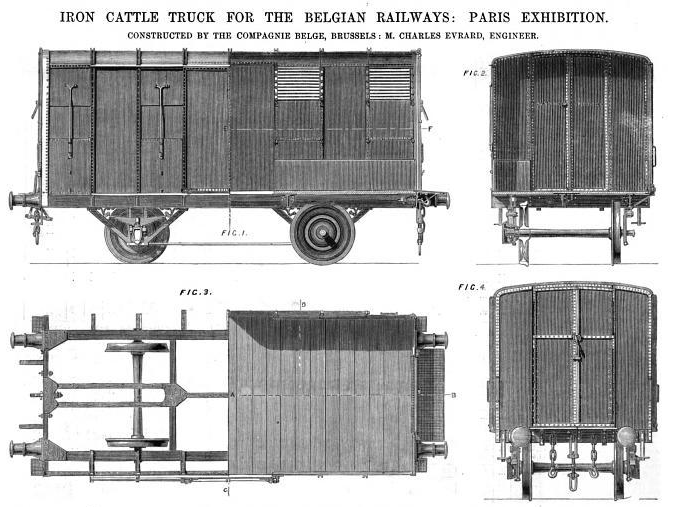
Iron cattle wagon, exhibited Paris Exhibition, 1867

In 1859, Charles Evrard acquired Parmentier Freres et Cie. based in La Croyère, (La Louvière, Belgium) and merged it with the Ateliers Charles Evrard (of Brussels, Belgium) to form the Compagnie Belge pour la Construction de Machines et de Matériels de Chemins de Fer (1862), (Note: Often referred to as Compagnie Belge pour la Construction de Matériels de Chemins de Fer) with a capital of 1 million francs. (Note: The company received royal assent in 1862, with limited on total issuable capital of 3 million francs (6,000 shares at 500 francs), the company prospectus mandated the formation of the company when 1 million francs of share capital had been raised.) Charles Evrard was the company's director. At the Exposition Universelle (1867) in Paris, the company exhibited a locomotive, passenger coaches, an iron goods wagon, and a steam rail crane.

In 1881, the plant in Brussels was closed and the factory's equipment was transferred, reducing pollution and other inconveniences caused to the populace of Brussels. (Note: The area of Molenbeek-Saint-Jean in Bruxelles, in which the Société Belge's factory was located gained the nickname "le Manchester belge" due to the industry there.)

A new company, the Société Anonyme Franco-Belge pour la Construction de Machines et de Matériel de Chemins de Fer, was created in 1881, (Note: Different sources give 15 Sep, and 12 October 1881, as the date of formation.) including all the assets of the 'Compagnie Belge' (representing 60% of the share capital); the company was capitalised to 8 million francs, the Banque franco-égyptienne invested in the new enterprise. In 1882 a new factory was established in Raismes in the north of France, allowing the company to circumvent protectionism in the French market; initially the factory at Raismes in France assembled machines using components manufactured across the border in Belgium. All types of railway rolling stock were built by the company. Charles Evrard died in 1896.

In 1911, the company was renamed Société Franco Belge de Matérial de Chemins de Fer. The company manufactured a wide variety of rolling stock (locomotives, carriages, specialised freight wagons) for clients, including the Belgian railways, private French railways, as well as exporting to Spain, Portugal, and other European countries; China, Turkey, and Indochina; as well as to African and South American countries.

Up to 1914, the company board was dominated by Belgians; after 1914, the company became majority owned by French interests, mainly from Paris. At this time the company had a capacity of around 50 locomotives and over 1,500 carriages and wagons per year; during German occupation during World War I, the plant in Raismes was ordered to carry out repair work, but this was resisted by the plant management - the factory was used under occupation as a sawmill.

Post World War I, the French and Belgian activities were separated into independent companies in 1927 with the Croyere site forming the company "Société Anglo-Franco-Belge" (SAFB or AFB), (Note: "Anglo-Franco-Belge, in full Société Anglo-Franco-Belge de Matériel de Chemins de Fer, after the acquisition of the Seneffe and Godarville plants: Anglo-Franco-Belge des Ateliers de La Croyère. Seneffe & Godarville.) which received English investment and specialised in equipment for metal and wooden fabrications for transportation equipment. The French operations of the company remained as "Franco-Belge".

=== Société Anglo-Franco-Belge (1927-64) ===
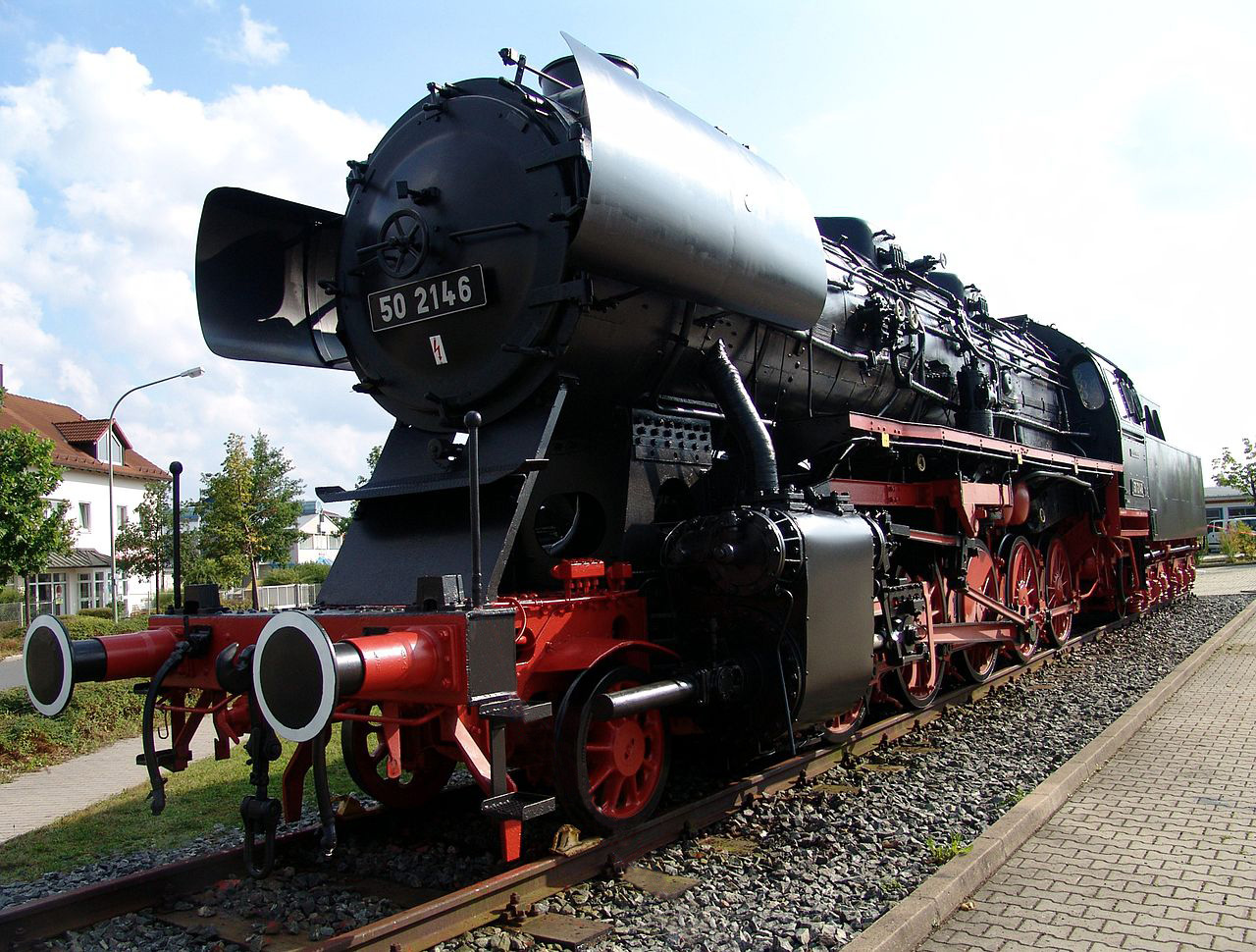
'Kriegslok' DRB Class 50 number 2146 built 1943 (2007)

In 1939, SAFB two acquired two metal working factories were absorbed, in Seneffe and Godarville (Chapelle-lez-Herlaimont), both in Hainaut, Belgium. During occupation, the company manufactured over 100 locomotives for the Deutsche Reichsbahn, as well as carrying out repair work. The company director Gilbert Bostsarron became involved in the French resistance network, and arranged allied attacks on the factory; his network was discovered by axis forces resulting in his being arrested and shot in 1944.

Post war the company experienced financial problems, in part due to loss of overseas export customers to American companies. In the 1950s, the company manufactured Electro-Motive Diesel engined diesel locomotives for the railways of Belgium (NMBS/SNCB classes 52, 53, 54, and Luxembourg (CFL class 800 and class 1600). The company also supplied the Israel Railways with its first diesel locomotives in 1952 with an EMD-powered Bo'Bo' design.

In 1964, the company merged with the road and rail vehicle manufacturing company S.A. des Ateliers Germain based in Monceau-sur-Sambre to form the Etablissements Germain-Anglo.

By 1967, the new company was on the verge of collapse with an empty order book—the staff were given notice of the closure which instigated a strike and sit-in at the factory. The situation became one of national interest, with the workers receiving support from trade unions across the country; the prime minister, Paul Vanden Boeynants, visited the factory to seek a resolution. On 1 June 1967, the workers returned to work, after several mitigation measures had been instigated, including short term transfer of staff to other rolling stock manufacturing companies, and large orders given to the metal fabrication plant. Despite this, in February 1968, the company Germain-Anglo ceased operation.

In 1969, the site of the plant in La Croyère was acquired by developer Société Frabelmar and a hypermarket of 6,000 m^{2} (65,000 sq ft), plus leisure facilities, was built, and opened in December 1970. (Note: 50.48514°N 4.204921°E, Cora, La Louvière. On site of former factory at La Croyère, La Louvière, Belgium.)

=== Société Franco-Belge (1927-81) ===
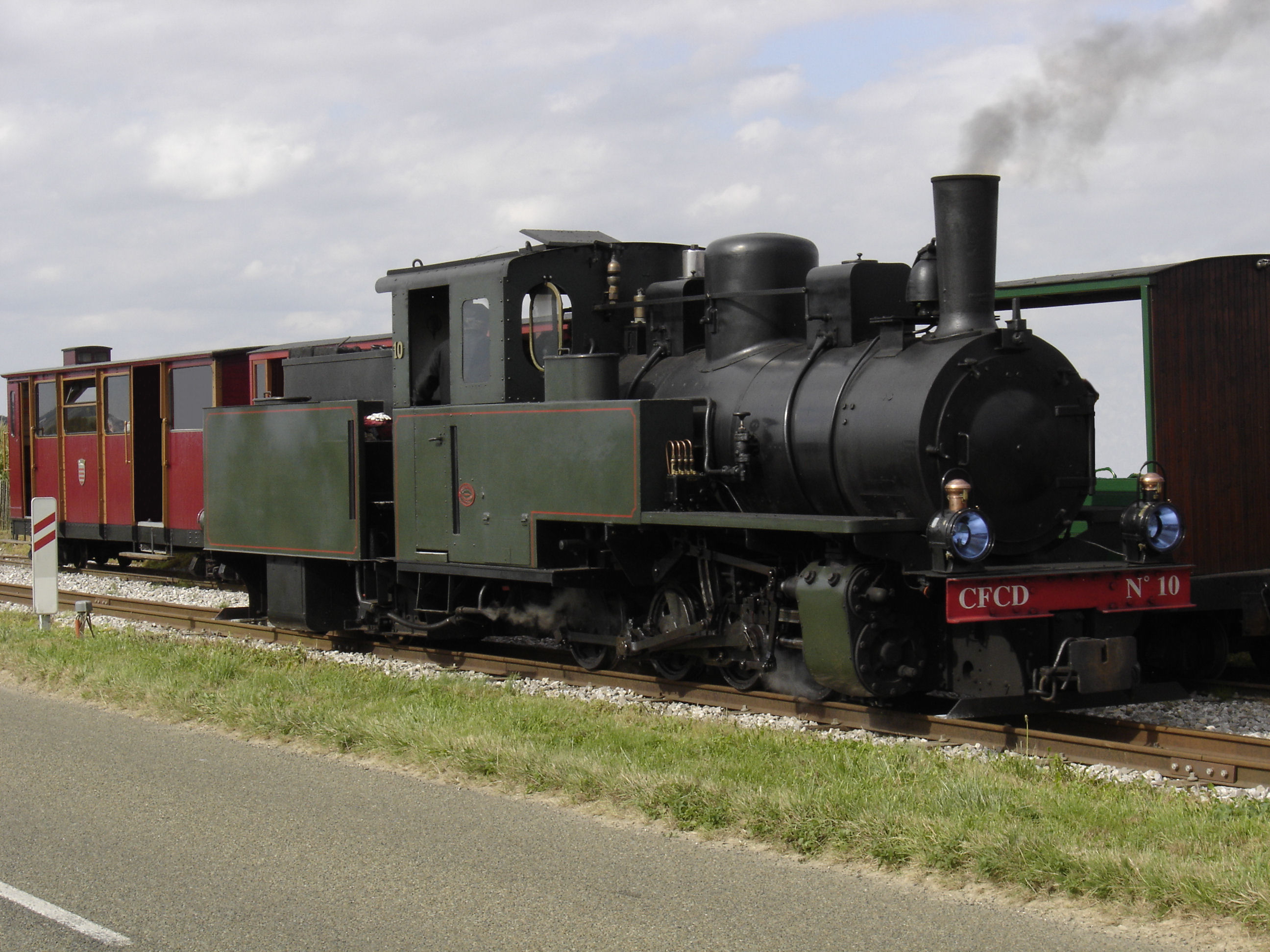
Franco-Belge 040 KDL built 1945 (2007)

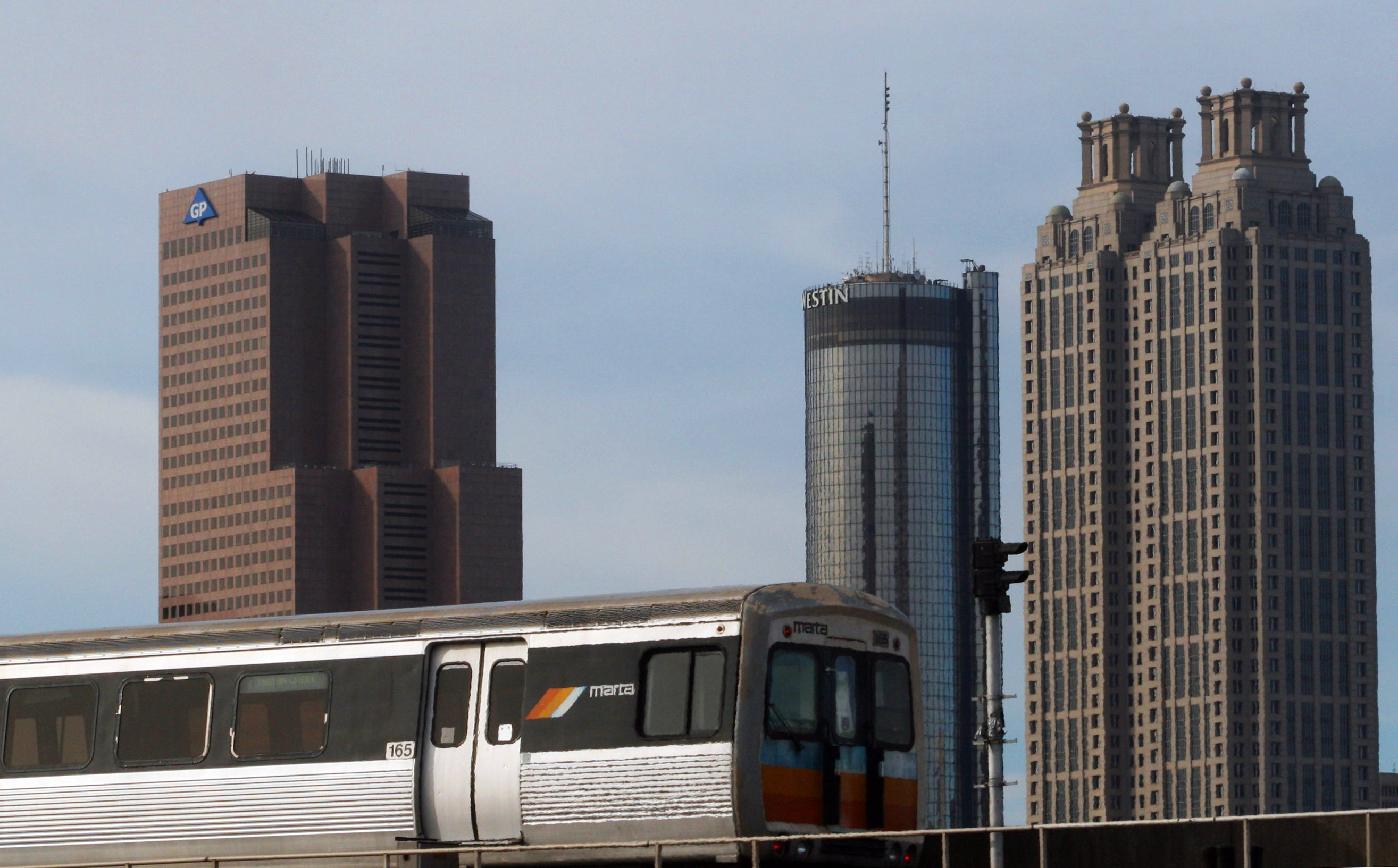
MARTA CQ310 series

Amongst other production in the 1930s, the Franco-Belge in Raismes manufactured Beyer, Peacock & Company designed 4-6-2+2-6-4 high speed (82 mph (132 km/h) achieved) 'Garratt' locomotives for Algeria, and also carriages for an imperial train built for Emperor Haile Selassie of Ethiopia. The association as sub-contractor to Beyer, Peacock & Company continued to the 1950s. Over 80 Indian Railways WG class 2-8-2 locomotives were produced in the early 1950s before production capacity at the Chittaranjan Locomotive Works, India, was built up.

During the 1970s, several hundred Corail coaches were built for the SNCF. In the late 1970s, the company won an order for 118 aluminium metro railcars (CQ310 series) for the MARTA subway system in Atlanta, USA.

In 1982, the company, then known as Soferval-franco-belge (Société ferroviaire du Valenciennes), was acquired by Alstom after a period of poor management and financial problems.

==== Alstom Valenciennes ====
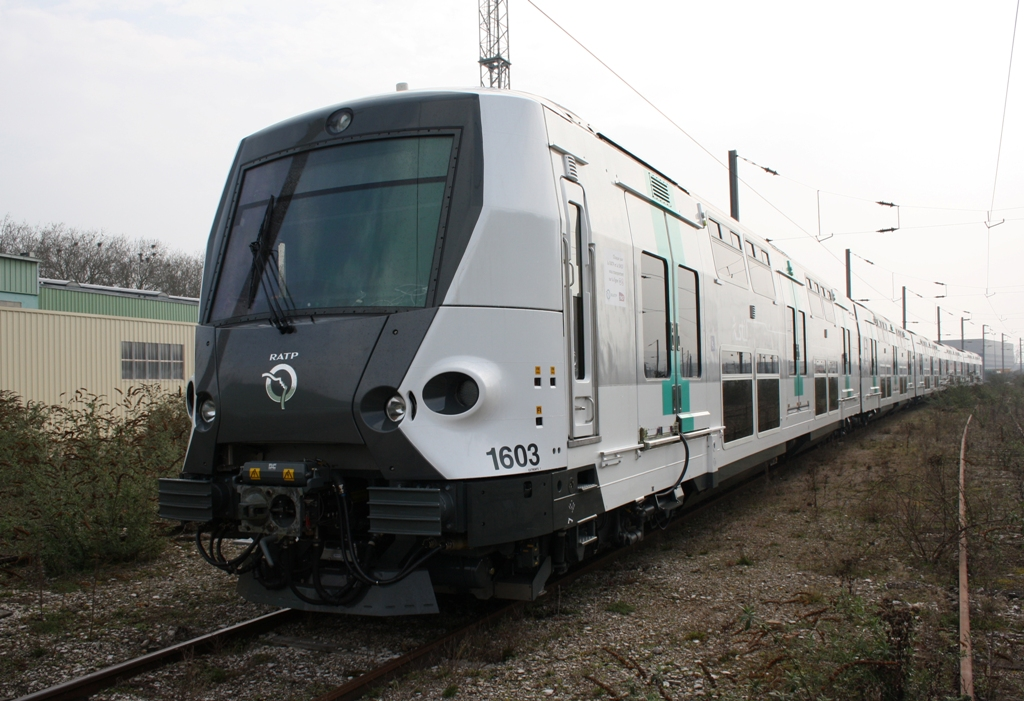
MI 09 train (Alstom/Bombardier) for RER (2011)

Under Alstom's ownership, the site at Raismes has been known as Alstom Petite-Forêt, Alstom Valenciennes, or Alstom Valenciennes Petite-Forêt (VPF).

The factory site is adjacent to a rail test track established at the beginning of the 21st century, the Centre d'Essais Ferroviaire, which is 61% owned by Alstom (2012). The test track, completed in 1999, includes 2.75 km suitable for testing at 100 km/h, a loop 1.85 km long for endurance testing at 80 km/h, and an S-shaped loop for testing trains with automatic control system (driverless). The industrial site at Raismes also houses several other engineering companies.

At the beginning of the 21st century, the plant's future was uncertain; by 2009, the situation had reversed — the factory had contracts for production till 2016, and employed 1350 people. Contracts included metros and trains for RATP and RER (Paris), obtained as part of consortia including Bombardier Transportation. The RER contract was worth €917 million, with a value to Alstom of €640 million. Within the Alstom group, the plant specialised in the design and production of metro trains, trams, and double-decker trains.

In late 2015 the factory was allotted the construction of 90 Bmx driving motor vehicles as part of a €1.3 billion contract awarded to an Alstom/Bombardier consortium for 445 M7 doubledeck passenger vehicles from SNCB.

== See also ==
- ANF Industrie, as of 2012 owned by Bombardier Inc., located nearby in Crespin, Arrondissement of Valenciennes, in the north of France
