= British Westinghouse =

Manufacturing company

British Westinghouse Electrical and Manufacturing Company was a subsidiary of the Pittsburgh, US-based Westinghouse Electric and Manufacturing Company. British Westinghouse would become a subsidiary of Metropolitan-Vickers in 1919; and after Metropolitan-Vickers merged with British Thomson-Houston in 1929, it became part of Associated Electrical Industries (AEI) in 1959. Further consolidation saw AEI taken over by GEC in 1967.

== Establishment ==
George Westinghouse established British Westinghouse in 1899 with capital from his own company and a smaller share from UK investors. The company commenced the construction of its first factory in Trafford Park, Manchester the same year. Manufacturing began in 1902, the same year as the rival British Thomson-Houston (BTH). BTH was majority owned by General Electric and the competition between BTH and British Westinghouse mirrored that of the parent companies, GE and Westinghouse in America. The Belgian electrical engineer, Paul Mossay, worked for BTH in the period 1902–1906 developing induction motors. Then in 1906 he started working for British Westinghouse, creating even larger motors.

== Receivership ==
In 1907 Westinghouse USA went into receivership with the result that executive control of the company was taken away from George Westinghouse, though he remained as president. Another effect of this was the increased independence of British Westinghouse. This was reinforced in 1910 when the board voted to remove George Westinghouse from his role as chairman. American Westinghouse retained over half the shares.

== World War I ==
In 1916 British Westinghouse, following the impression that American control of the company hindered its performance during World War I, began the transition to a British owned company. Metropolitan Carriage Wagon Company bought a controlling interest in the group in 1917. The same year the board accepted a merger with Vickers and the name Metropolitan-Vickers was chosen. Vickers assumed control in 1919 when Metropolitan Carriage was sold to the company.

== Products ==
Products included gas engines, steam engines, electric generators, transformers, switchgear, meters, motors, control gear, and arc lamps. During World War I, British Westinghouse built some small petrol-electric locomotives for the War Department Light Railways. Similar locomotives were built by Dick, Kerr & Co.
