= Mossay and Co. =

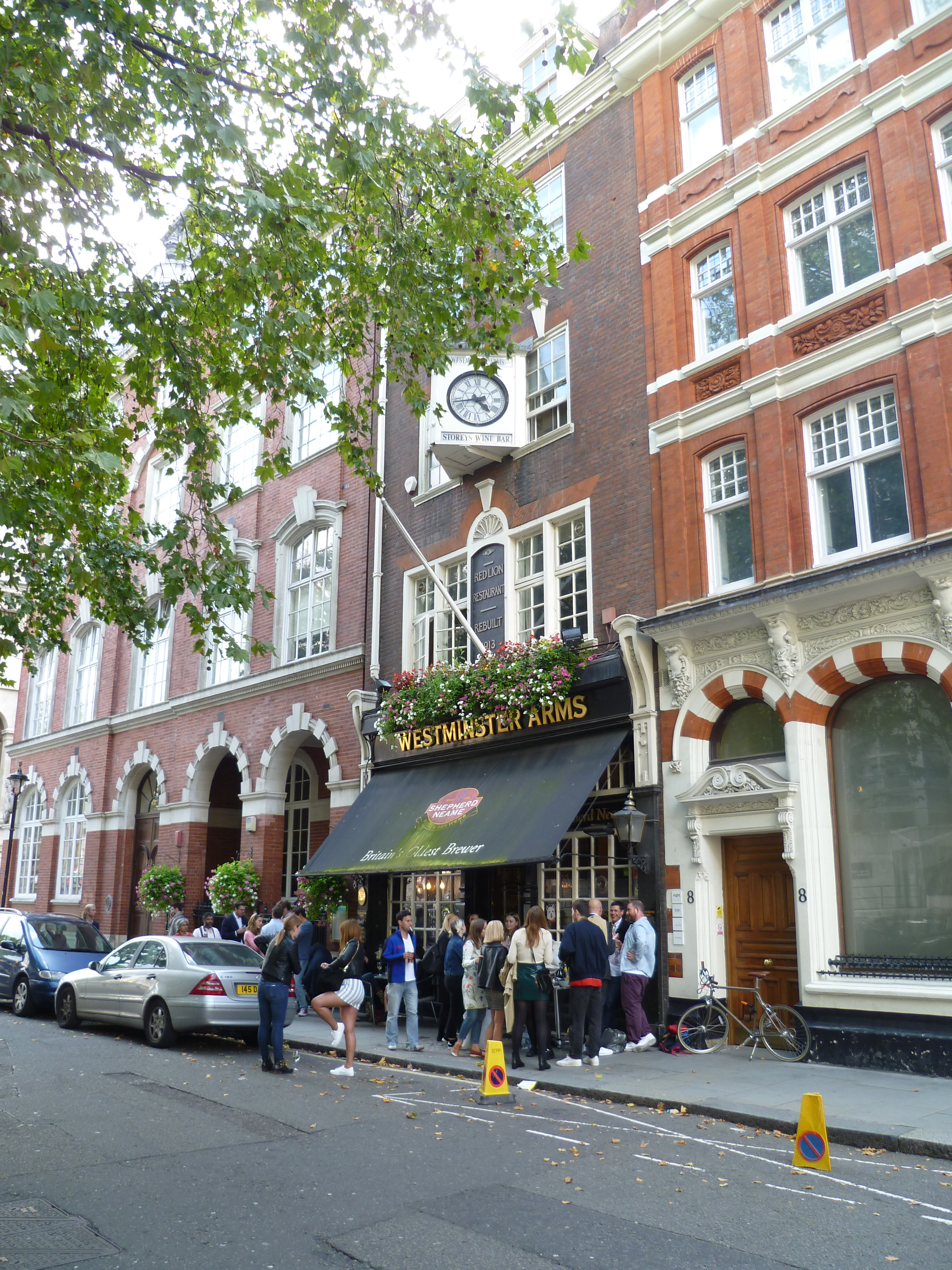
Westminster Arms, Storey's Gate, London SW1, site of Mossay and Co. offices

Mossay and Co. was a company set up by Paul Mossay in 1913 as a consultancy for the development of electric vehicles and other devices. The original directors were Alfred Makower, Alfred Mays-Smith and A. Berkeley, as well as Mossay himself. They had an office at 9 Princes Street, Westminster SW1 (now Westminster Arms, 9 Storey Gate).
