= Ateliers Germain =

SA Ateliers Germain
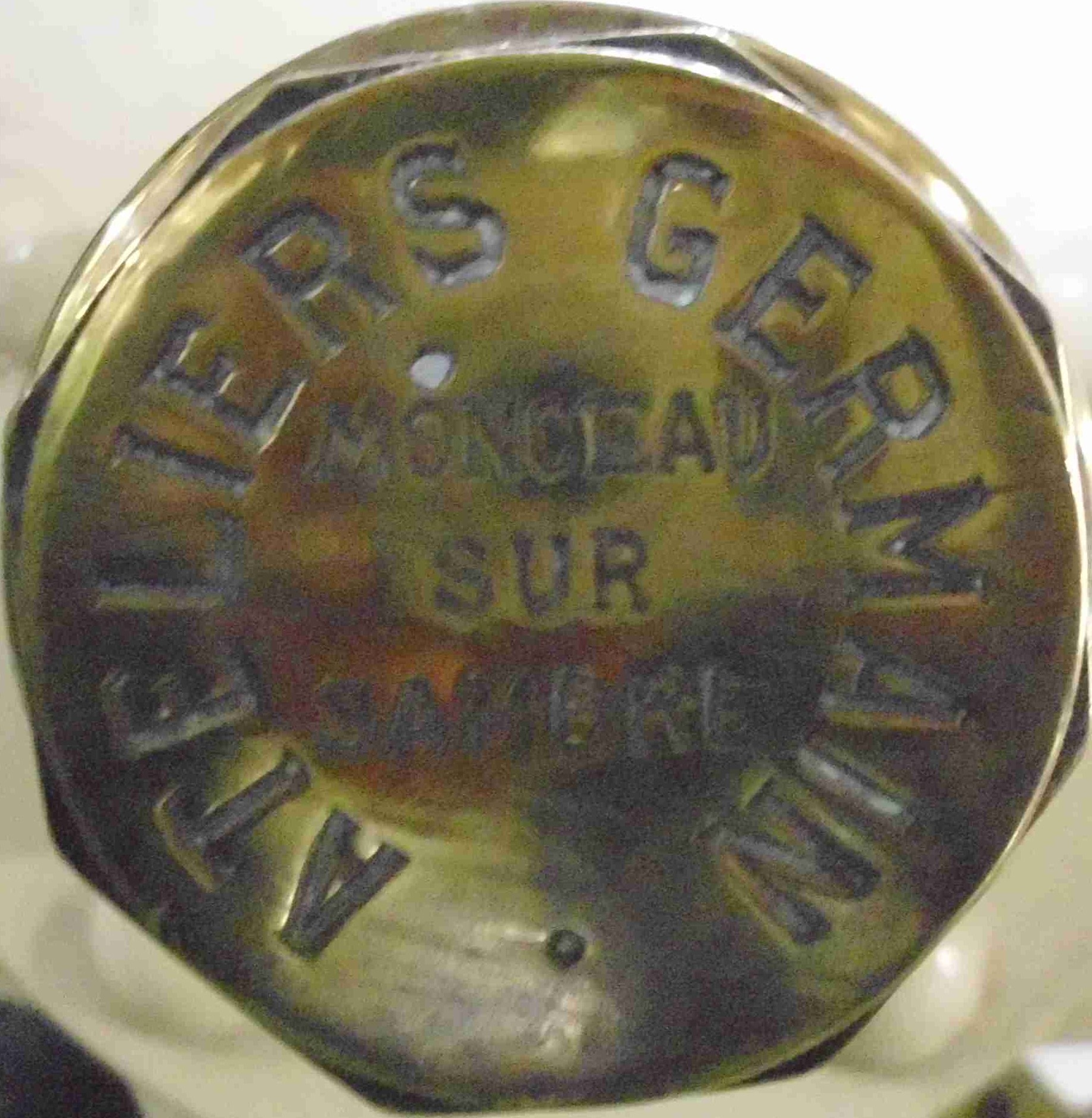
- Founded: 1897
- Defunct: 1968
- Fate: merged with Société Anglo-Franco-Belge 1964
- Successor: Etablissements Germain-Anglo (1964-8)
- Headquarters: Monceau-sur-Sambre, Charleroi, Belgium

The Ateliers Germain was a Belgian engineering manufacturing company based in Monceau-sur-Sambre near Charleroi. The company manufactured motorcars under license in the early 20th century until the First World War, after which is concentrated on rail vehicle manufacture.

It merged with the Société Anglo-Franco-Belge in the 1960s shortly before becoming defunct.

== History ==
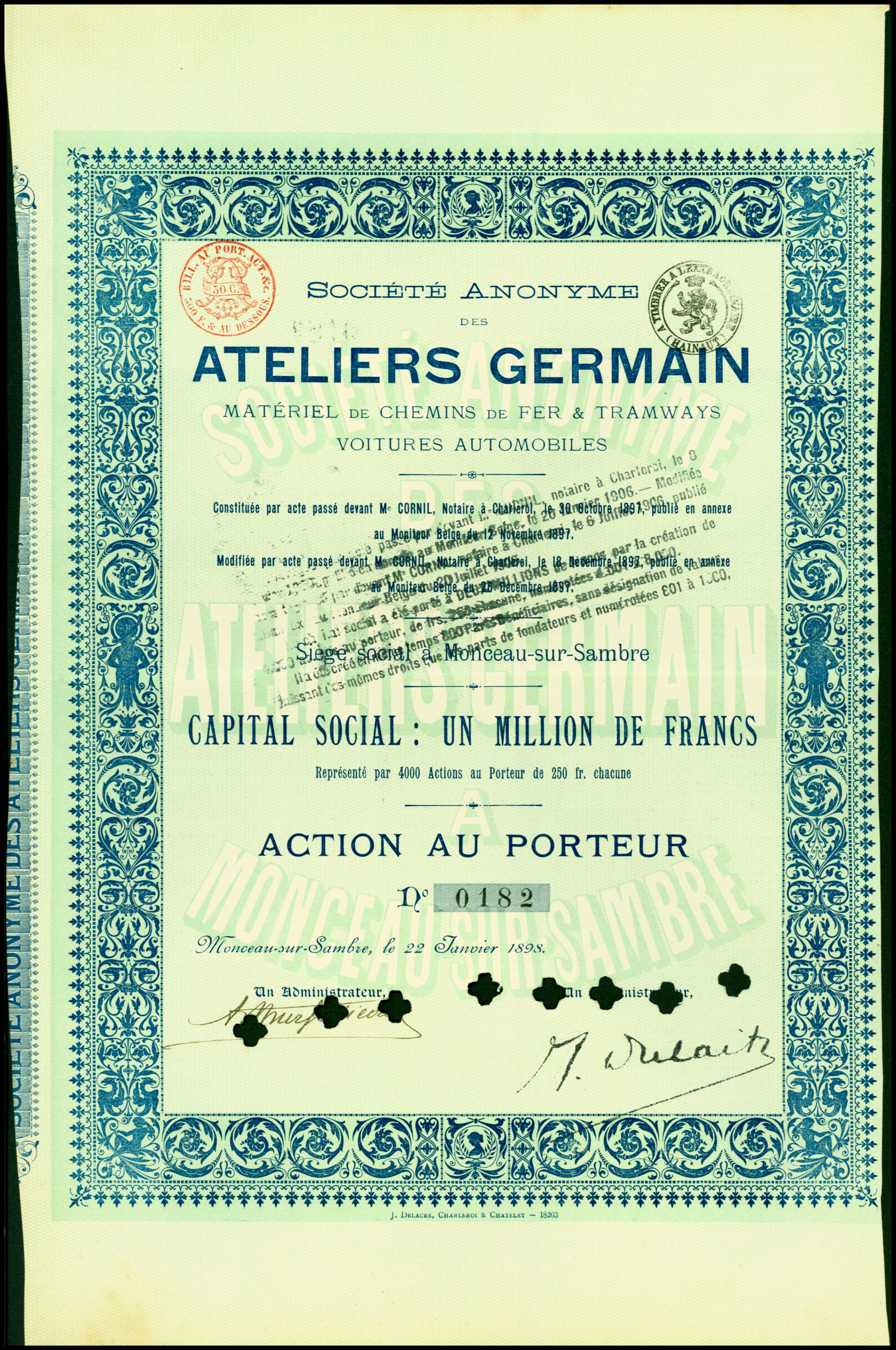
Share of the Ateliers Germain, issued 22. January 1898

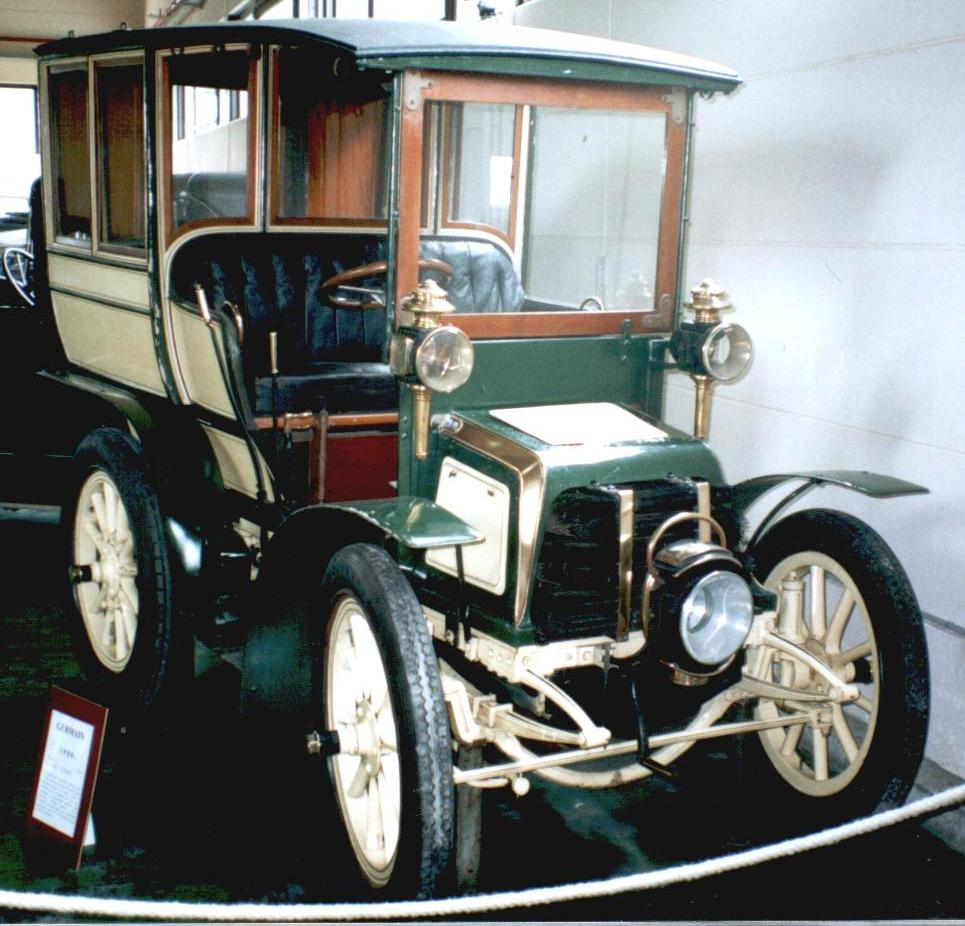
Germain motorcar of 1900

The Société des Ateliers Germain (Matériel de Chemins de Fer & Tramways, Voitures Automobiles) was founded 30 October 1897, with a factory at Monceau-sur-Sambre, Belgium.

The company initially manufactured automobiles under license from Daimler-Phoenix and Panhard-Levassor, and later small automobiles (Voiturettes) under license from Elan, Renault, and Hardt. The company used the brand names "Germain", "Panhard belges" and "Daimler belges". Car production continued up to the beginning of the First World War.

During the conflict British battle tanks captured at the battle of Cambrai were repaired at the factory, and used by the Germans at the battle of St. Quentin. After the end of the first world war the automobile production ceased, and the primary product was rail vehicles.

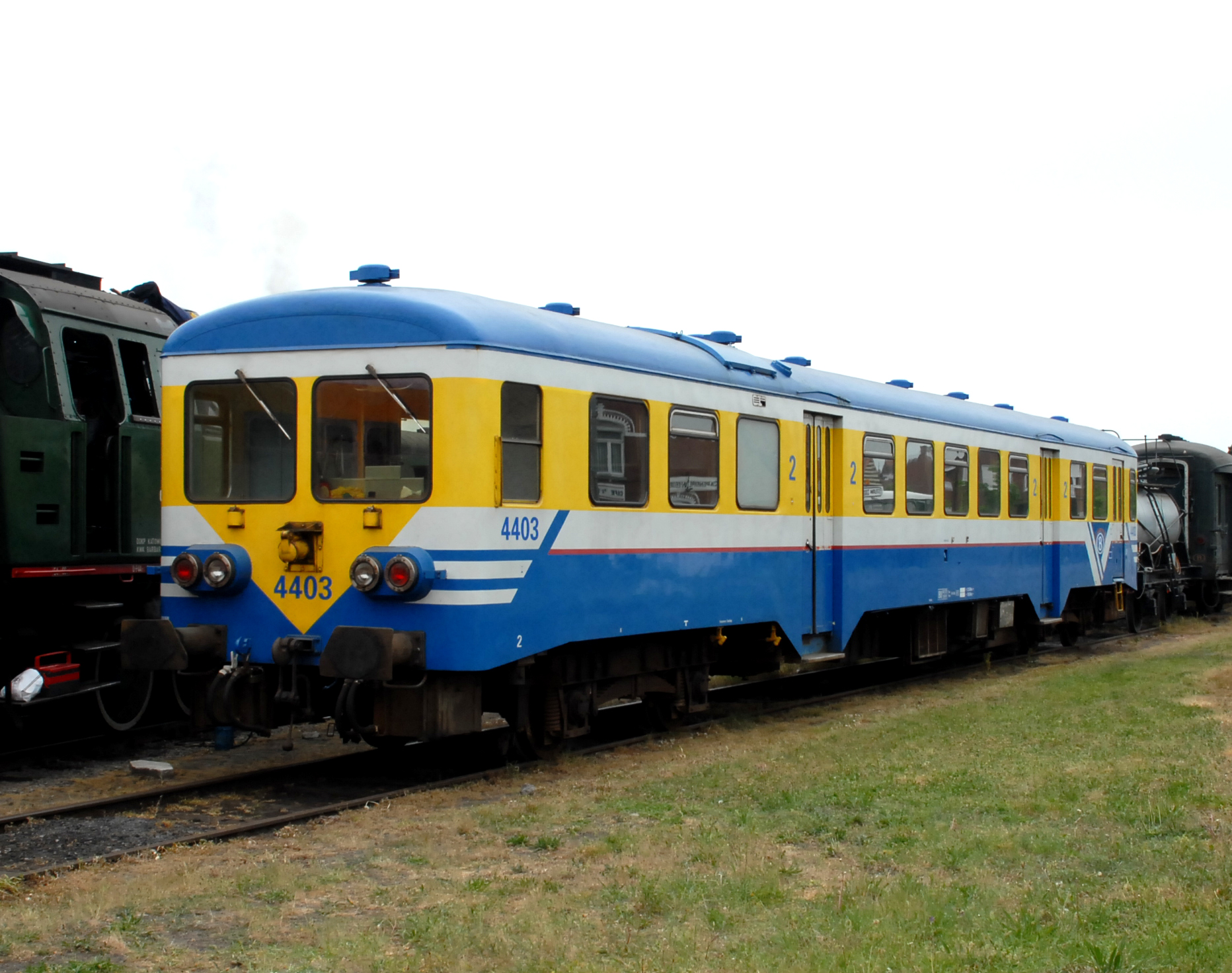
ex-SNCB class 44, built 1954.

In 1964 the company merged with the Société Anglo-Franco-Belge to form the Etablissements Germain Anglo.

The defunct factory in Monceau sur Sambre was demolished and redeveloped in the 1990s.

== Notable staff ==
- Paul Mossay, Belgian electrical engineer worked for the company briefly before setting up his consultancy in London in 1913.
