= Union-Elektricitäts-Gesellschaft =

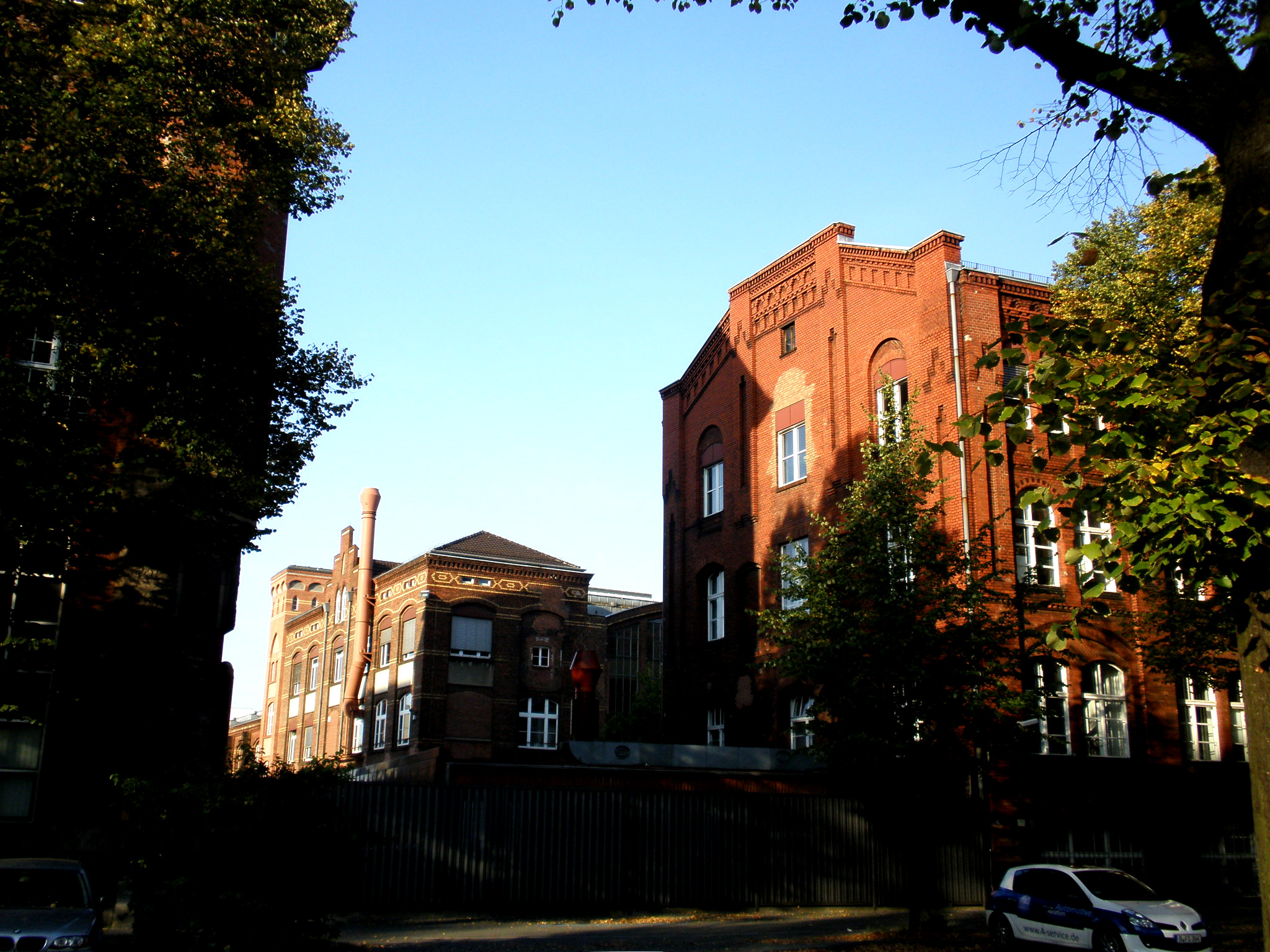
UEG premises, 12-16 Huttenstraße, in Moabit, Berlin

Union-Elektricitäts-Gesellschaft (UEG) was a German subsidiary of the American Thomson-Houston Electric Company. The subsidiary was established to represent the parent company's interests in Germany, Austria-Hungary, Belgium, the Netherlands, Denmark, Finland, Sweden, Norway, Russia and Turkey. The company was founded in January 1892 by Thomson-Houston, Ludwig Loewe & Co. and Thyssen & Co. and existed as an independent company until it was absorbed by the AEG on February 27, 1904.

== Work completed ==
In the twelve years between 1892 and 1904, the UEG built a further 2400 kilometers of electric railways, principally in Europe, and delivered 5285 tramcars to over seventy tram companies. These included:

- 1892 Bremen
- 1894 Brussels, Gotha
- 1895 Munich
- 1896 Liège, Cairo
- 1897 Aachen, Bergen
- 1899 Batavia
- 1901 Amsterdam
- 1902 Buenos Aires

== Notable staff ==
- Alfred Makower worked for UEG after graduating from the Technische Hochschule in Charlottenburg (now Technische Universität Berlin) in 1900. He moved back to England in 1902 to work for UEG's sister company, British Thomson-Houston.
