= Weigel Motors =

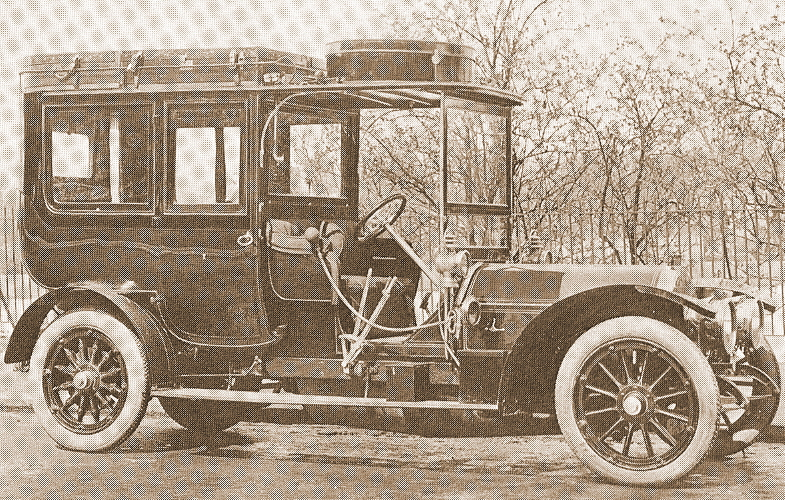
1908 Weigel

Weigel Motors Ltd was a British automobile manufacturer from 1907 to 1910 at Coswell Road in London. The company built the first British cars to participate in Grand Prix Racing when it entered 2 cars in the 1907 French Grand Prix at Dieppe, driven by Gregor Laxen and Pryce Harrison. These were powered by Straight Eight engines displacing 14,866cc (907.2ci), formed by coupling two 40 hp engines in tandem. Financial difficulties emerged in 1907, as the company was reformed, and moved to a new factory in Olaf Street, Latimer Road, Notting Hill. For the 1908 French Grand Prix Weigel entered three four-cylinder cars, with engines displacing 12,781cc (779.9ci) driven by Harrison, Laxen and Shannon. Again, none of the cars finished. The firm's assets were acquired in 1910 by Crowdy Limited, who continued manufacture of cars in the Olaf Street works, at first merely continuing the existing 25 hp and 40 hp Weigel designs and later producing a 19 hp four and a 29 hp six with dashboard radiators similar to those on Renault cars of the era. At the end of 1911 they moved to West Heath Works, Northfield, Birmingham producing cars with normally-located radiators, before going out of business.

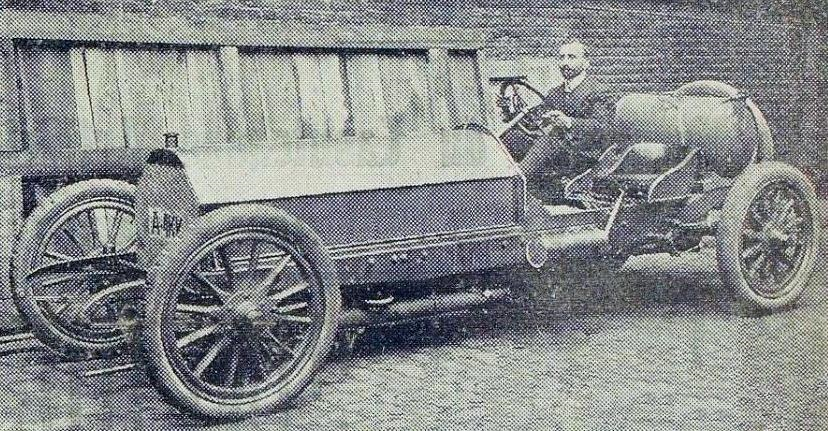
Weigel car at the ACF Grand Prix 1907

== Models ==
Model	Years	Engine	Bore/stroke	Displacement	Wheelbase
40 hp	1907–1910	4 cylinder	130 × 140	7,433 cm^{3}	3,023 mm
25 hp	1908–1910	4 cylinder	110 × 120	4,562 cm^{3}	2,896 mm
60 hp	1908–1909	6 cylinder	130 × 140	11,150 cm^{3}	3,658 mm
20 hp	1910	4 cylinder		2,851 cm^{3}	2,819 mm
