= Alfred Makower =

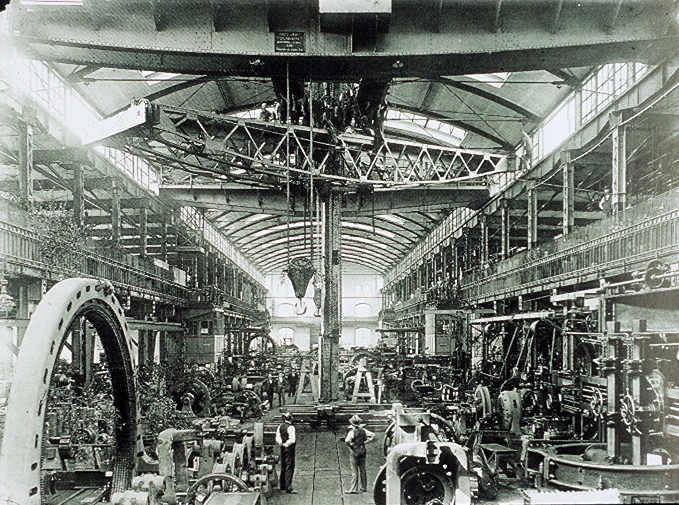
Turbine Hall at UEG, in 1900 when Makower went to work for them

Alfred Jacques Makower (9 May 1876 in London – 1 February 1941) was electrical engineer and community activist. He was head of the Electrical Engineering Department of South-Western Polytechnic.

Alfred was the son of a German silk merchant. He attended University College School from 1884, the University College itself in 1894, then Trinity College, Cambridge, in 1895. Here he took the Mathematical Tripos, before moving on to the Technische Hochschule in Charlottenburg (now Technische Universität Berlin), in 1898. Then in 1900 he was given a job by Union-Elektricitäts-Gesellschaft (UEG), a subsidiary of the Thomson-Houston Electric Company. He then returned to England to work for British Thomson-Houston Company in 1902. In 1904 he was appointed head of the Electrical Engineering Department of South-Western Polytechnic. In 1913 he became a founding director Mossay and Co., a company established by Paul Mossay, along with A. Berkeley and Alfred Mays-Smith.

Alfred was chair of the Professional Committee of the German Jewish Aid Committee, in which capacity he helped several German engineer refugees with financial support and help in finding employment amongst his contacts in the engineering sector. He was vice-president of the Jewish Board of Guardians whose General Relief Committee he also chaired.

He had a son, Ernest S. Makower.
