= Paul Mossay =

Paul Alphonse Hubert Mossay (1877- 25 June 1963, Knutsford) was a Belgian electrical engineer involved in the development of electric vehicles.

Mossay attended grammar school in Verviers and then went to University of Liège, where he gained a degree in Electrical Engineering. Mossay worked for British Thomson-Houston from 1902 until 1906. Then he worked for British Westinghouse before moving on to North German Automobile and Engine in Bremen in 1907. Here he was responsible for designing both the engines and the electric vehicles themselves. He then returned to Belgium, where he worked for Ateliers Germain in Monceau-sur-Sambre on petrol powered vehicles. However, he then went back to England and established Mossay and Co. as a consultancy company which worked with Ransomes, Sims & Jefferies in developing the Orwell Truck.
