= Sept-Meules =

- Commune
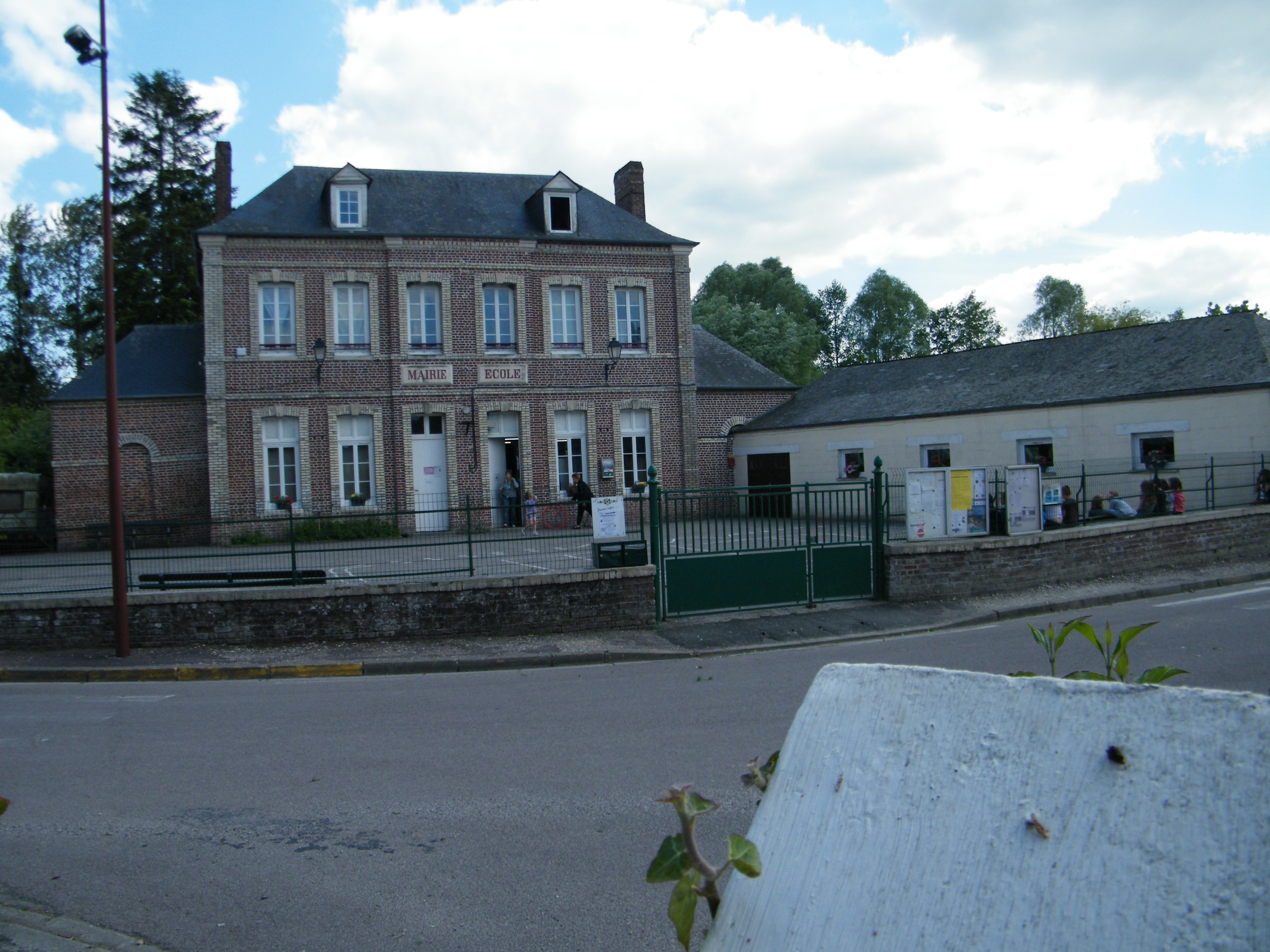
- The town hall and school in Sept-Meules
- Location of Sept-Meules
- Location within France Location within Normandy
- Coordinates: 49°57′15″N 1°25′14″E
- Country: France
- Region: Normandy
- Department: Seine-Maritime
- Arrondissement: Dieppe
- Canton: Eu
- Intercommunality: CC Falaises du Talou

Government
  - Mayor (2026–32): Marie-Pierre Tailleux
- Area^{1}: 8.22 km^{2} (3.17 sq mi)
- Elevation: 50 m (160 ft)
- Highest elevation: 158 m (518 ft)
- Lowest elevation: 40 m (130 ft)
- Population (2023): 172
  - Density: 20.9/km^{2} (54.2/sq mi)
- Time zone: UTC+01:00 (CET)
  - Summer (DST): UTC+02:00 (CEST)
- INSEE/Postal code: 76671 /76260
- ^{1} French Land Register data, which excludes lakes, ponds, glaciers > 1 km^{2} (0.386 sq mi or 247 acres) and river estuaries.

Sept-Meules is a commune in the Seine-Maritime department in the Normandy region in northern France.

The name's toponomy is from Latin Septem molas ("seven stones", first attested 875 AD), conjecturally from some nearby megalithic structure.

== Geography ==
Sept-Meules is a small farming and forestry village situated in the valley of the Yères river in the Pays de Caux, some 16 miles (26 km) east of Dieppe at the junction of the D1314, D16 and D58 roads.

== Population ==
Historical population
Year	Pop.	±% p.a.
1968	188	—
1975	148	−3.36%
1982	178	+2.67%
1990	173	−0.36%
1999	163	−0.66%
2007	164	+0.08%
2012	160	−0.49%
2017	193	+3.82%
2023	172	−1.90%
Source: INSEE

== Places of interest ==
- The church of Notre-Dame, dating from the eleventh century.
- A feudal motte.

== See also ==
- Communes of the Seine-Maritime department
