= Monceau-sur-Sambre =

Monceau-sur-Sambre Moncea-so-Sambe (Walloon)
- Former municipality of Belgium
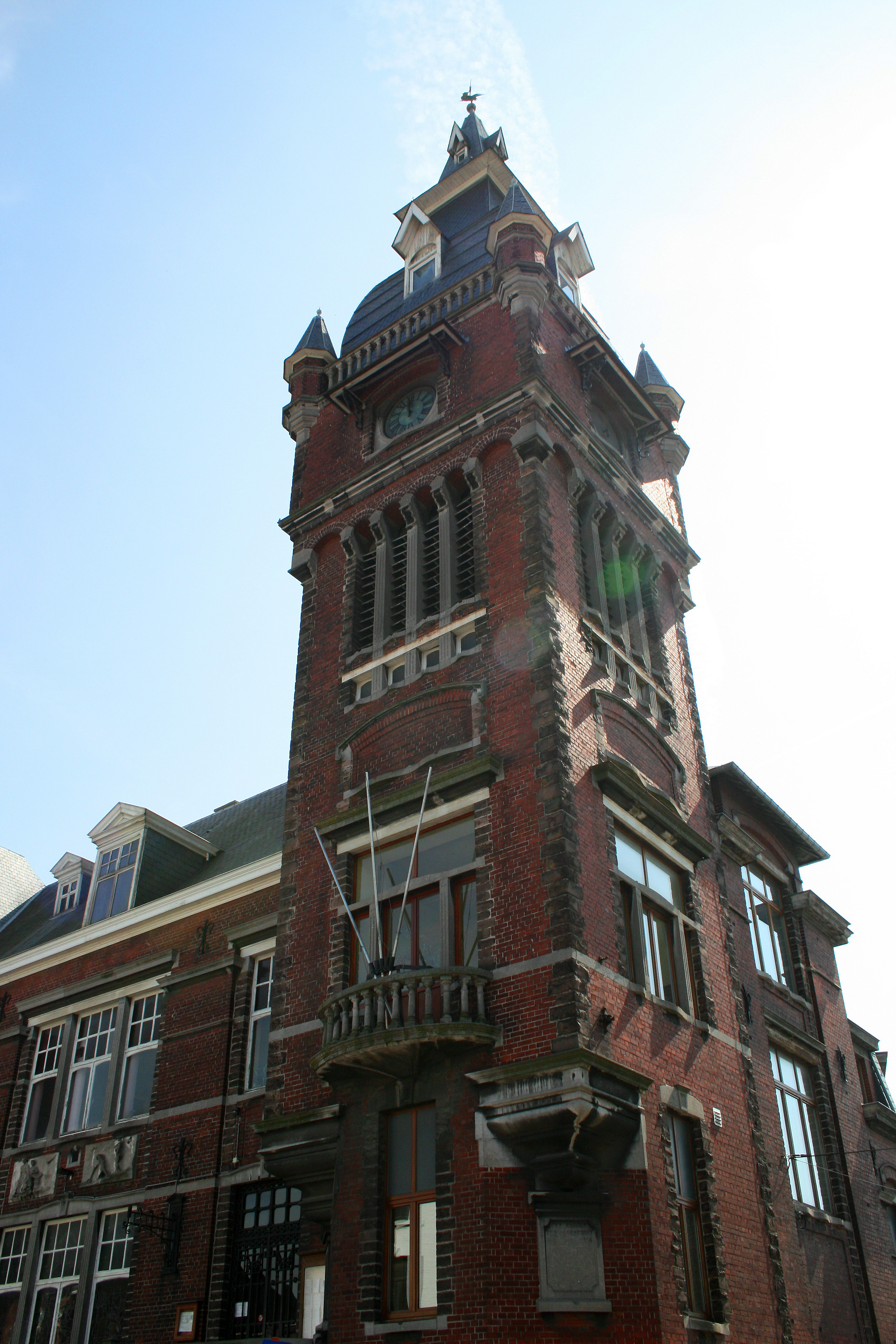
- Former town hall of Monceau-sur-Sambre

- Location in the municipality of Charleroi

- Location in Belgium
- Coordinates: 50°24′N 4°22′E
- Country: Belgium
- Region: Wallonia
- Community: French Community
- Province: Hainaut
- Municipality: Charleroi

Area
  - Total: 2.7 sq mi (7.1 km^{2})

Population (2001)
  - Total: 8,617
- Time zone: UTC+1 (CET)
  - Summer (DST): UTC+2 (CEST)
- Postal code: 6031
- Area code: 071

Monceau-sur-Sambre (French pronunciation: [mɔ̃so syʁ sɑ̃bʁ], lit. 'Monceau on Sambre'; Walloon: Moncea-so-Sambe) is a town of Wallonia and a district of the municipality of Charleroi, located in the province of Hainaut, Belgium.

It was a municipality of its own before the merger of the municipalities in 1977.

Monceau is located west of Charleroi centre, to the north of the N90 motorway and east of the R3. The parish church is dedicated to Saint Louis de Gonzague.

== Sights ==
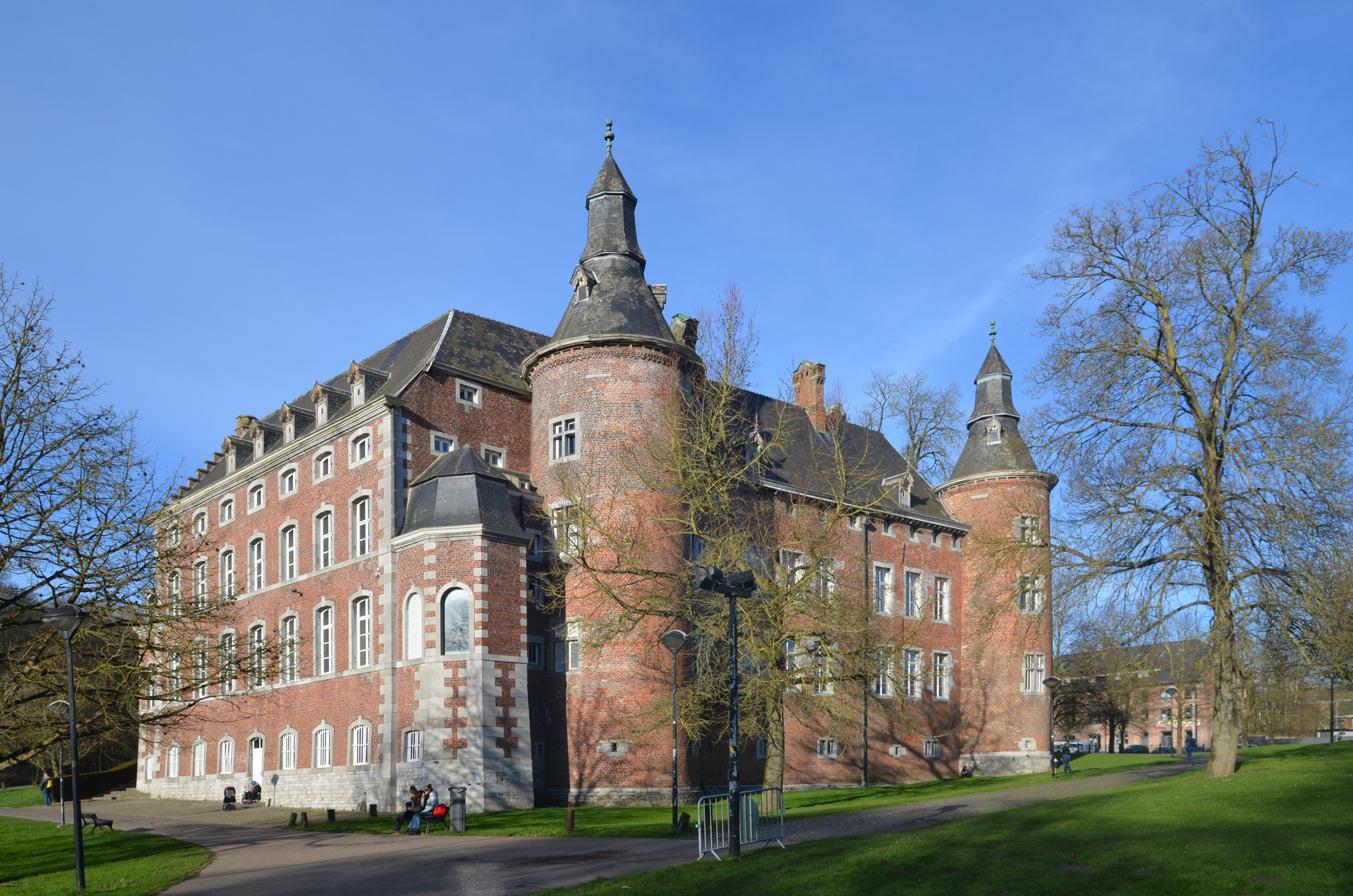
Castle of Monceau-sur-Sambre (17/18th centuries)

The Château de Monceau-sur-Sambre, with its park and arboretum, lies to the south of the suburb, close to the N90.

== People born in Monceau-sur-Sambre ==
- Yvonne Vieslet, Belgian martyrdom (1908-1918)
